= Prehistoric Europe =

Early Prehistory
- Lower Paleolithic: Homo antecessor Homo heidelbergensis
- Middle Paleolithic: Homo neanderthalensis
- Upper Paleolithic: Homo neanderthalensis, Homo sapiens population of all regions
- Mesolithic: Hunter-gatherers
- Neolithic: Agriculture, herding, pottery

Late Prehistory
- Chalcolithic: Old Europe (archaeology), Indo-Europeans, Varna culture
- Bronze Age: Minoan Crete, Mycenaean civilization, Korakou culture, Cycladic culture, Lusatian culture, Yamnaya culture
- Iron Age: Ancient Greece, Thracians, Ancient Rome, Iberians, Germanic tribes, Hallstatt culture

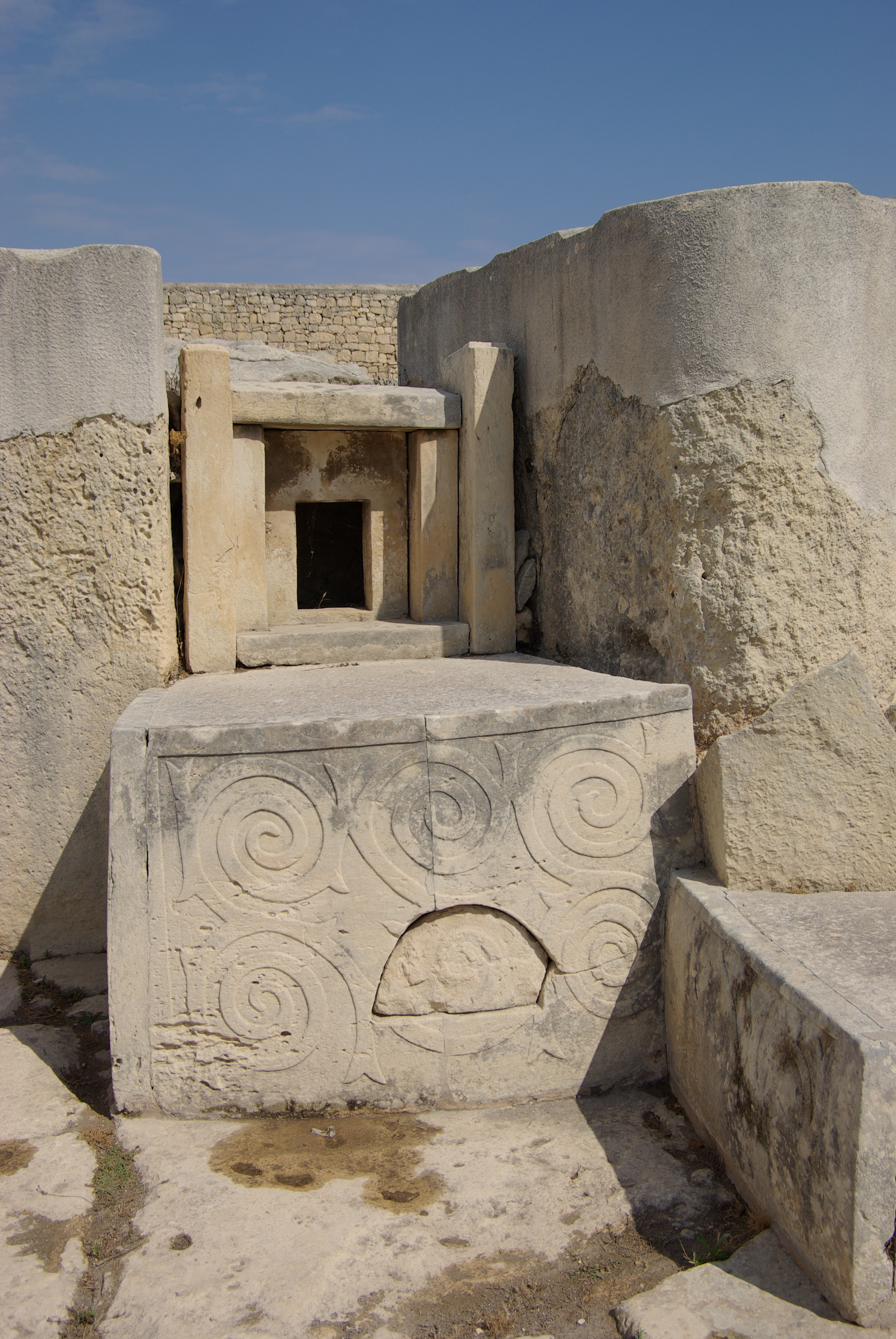
Tarxien Temples, Malta, around 3150 BC

Prehistoric Europe refers to Europe before the start of written records, beginning in the Lower Paleolithic. As history progresses, considerable regional unevenness in cultural development emerges and grows. The region of the eastern Mediterranean is, due to its geographic proximity, greatly influenced and inspired by the classical Middle Eastern civilizations, and adopts and develops the earliest systems of communal organization and writing. The Histories of Herodotus (from around 440 BC) is the oldest known European text that seeks to systematically record traditions, public affairs and notable events.

== Overview ==
Widely dispersed, isolated finds of individual fossils of bone fragments (Atapuerca, Mauer mandible), stone artifacts or assemblages suggest that during the Lower Paleolithic, spanning from 3 million until 300,000 years ago, palaeo-human presence was rare and typically separated by thousands of years. The karstic region of the Atapuerca Mountains in Spain represents the currently earliest known and reliably dated location of residence for more than a single generation and a group of individuals.

Homo neanderthalensis emerged in Eurasia between 600,000 and 350,000 years ago as the earliest body of European people that left behind a substantial tradition, a set of evaluable historic data through a rich fossil record in Europe's limestone caves and a patchwork of occupation sites over large areas. These include Mousterian cultural assemblages. Modern humans arrived in Mediterranean Europe during the Middle Paleolithic between 56,800 and 51,700 years ago, and both species occupied a common habitat for several thousand years. Research has so far produced no universally accepted conclusive explanation as to what caused the Neanderthal's extinction between 40,000 and 28,000 years ago.

Homo sapiens later populated the entire continent during the Mesolithic, and advanced north, following the retreating ice sheets of the Last Glacial Maximum that spanned between 26,500 and 19,000 years ago. A 2015 publication on ancient European DNA collected from Spain to Russia concluded that the original hunter-gatherer population had assimilated a wave of "farmers" who had arrived from the Near East during the Neolithic about 8,000 years ago.

The Mesolithic era site Lepenski Vir in modern-day Serbia, the earliest documented sedentary community of Europe with permanent buildings, as well as monumental art, precedes by many centuries sites previously considered to be the oldest known. The community's year-round access to a food surplus prior to the introduction of agriculture was the basis for the sedentary lifestyle. However, the earliest record for the adoption of elements of farming can be found in Starčevo, a community with close cultural ties.

Belovode and Pločnik, also in Serbia, is currently the oldest reliably dated copper smelting site in Europe (around 7,000 years ago). It is attributed to the Vinča culture, which on the contrary provides no links to the initiation of or a transition to the Chalcolithic or Copper Age.

The process of smelting bronze is an imported technology with debated origins and history of geographic cultural profusion. It was established in Europe about 3200 BC in the Aegean and production was centered around Cyprus, the primary source of copper for the Mediterranean for many centuries.

The introduction of metallurgy, which initiated unprecedented technological progress, has also been linked with the establishment of social stratification, the distinction between rich and poor, and use of precious metals as the means to fundamentally control the dynamics of culture and society.

The European Iron Age culture also originates in the East through the absorption of the technological principles obtained from the Hittites about 1200 BC, finally arriving in Northern Europe by 500 BC.

During the Iron Age, Central, Western and most of Eastern Europe gradually entered the actual historical period. Greek maritime colonization and Roman terrestrial conquest form the basis for the diffusion of literacy in large areas to this day. This tradition continued in an altered form and context for the most remote regions (Greenland and Eastern Balts, 13th century) via the universal body of Christian texts, including the incorporation of East Slavic peoples and Russia into the Orthodox cultural sphere. Latin and ancient Greek languages continued to be the primary and best way to communicate and express ideas in liberal arts education and the sciences all over Europe until the early modern period.

== Stone Age ==
=== Paleolithic (Old Stone Age) ===
==== Oldest fossils, artifacts and sites ====
Name	Abstract	Age	Location	Information	Coordinates
Dmanisi skull 5	Homo erectus	1.77 Mio	Dmanisi	"early Homo adult with small brains but large body mass"	41°19′N 44°12′E
Lézignan-la-Cèbe	Lithic Assemblage	1.57 Mio	Lézignan-la-Cébe	a 30 pebble culture, lithic tools, argon dated	43°29′N 3°26′E
Kozarnika	limestone cave	1.5 Mio	Kozarnika	Human molar tooth (considered to be the earliest human—Homo erectus/Homo ergaster—traces discovered in Europe outside Caucasian region), lower palaeolithic assemblages that belong to a core-and-flake non-Acheulian industry, and incised bones that may be the earliest example of human symbolic behaviour.	43°39′N 22°42′E
Orce Man	tooth and tools	1.4 Mio	Venta Micena	most finds are stone tools	37°43′N 2°28′W
Pleistocene mandible	Homo antecessor	1.3 Mio	Atapuerca Mountains		42°22′N 3°30′W
Mauer 1	Homo heidelbergensis	600,000	Mauer	earliest Homo heidelbergensis	49°20′N 8°47′E
Boxgrove Man	Homo heidelbergensis	500,000	Boxgrove		50°51′N 0°42′W
Tautavel Man	Homo erectus	450,000	Tautavel	proposed subspecies	42°48′N 2°45′E
Swanscombe Man	Homo heidelbergensis	400,000	Swanscombe	north-western habitat maximum	51°26′N 0°17′E
Schöningen spears	wooden javelins	380,000	Schoningen 1995	active hunt	42°48′N 2°45′E

==== Lower and Middle Paleolithic human presence ====
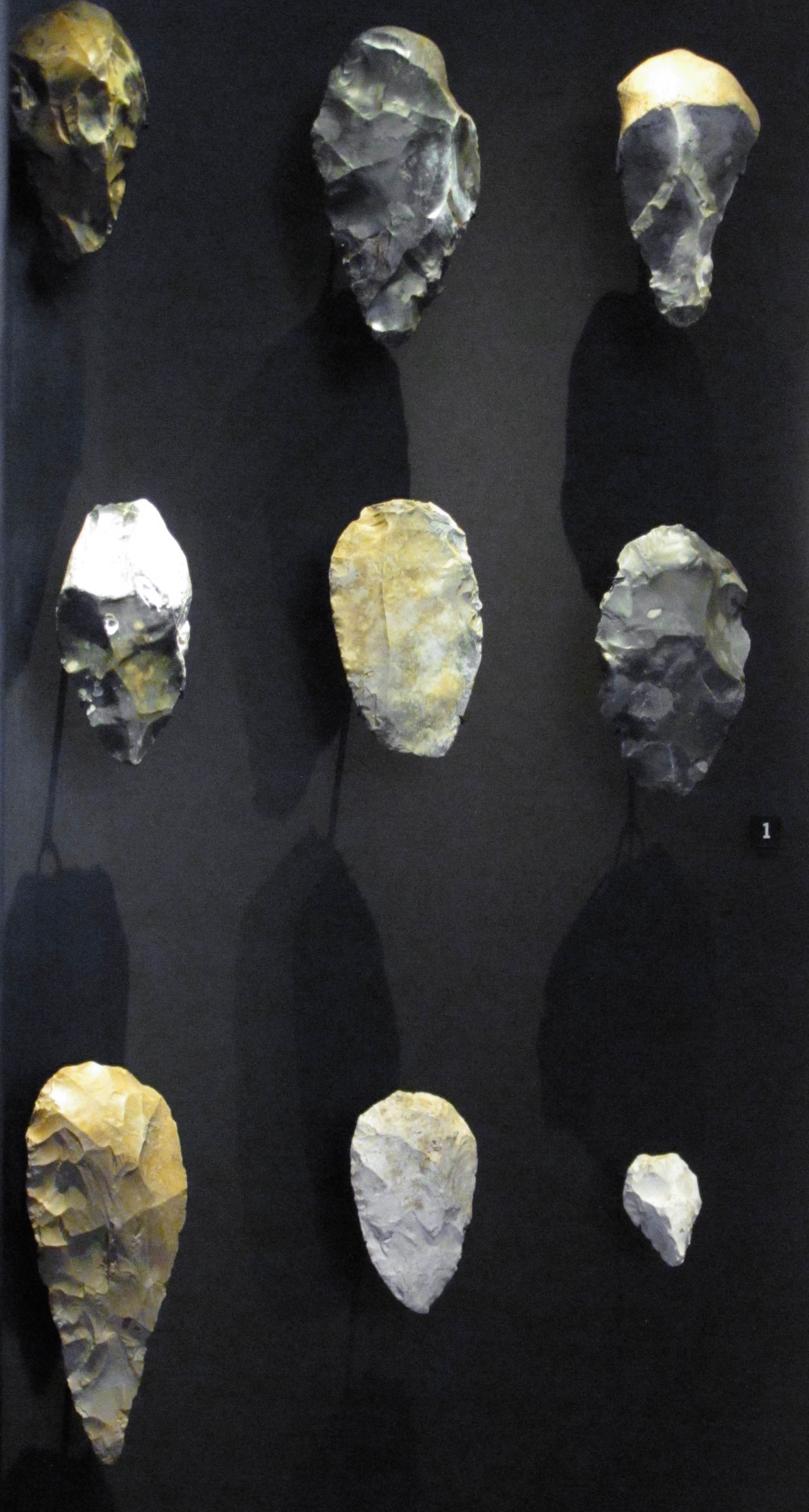
Acheulean hand axes and hand axe-like implements, flint, 800,000–300,000 BC

The climatic record of the Paleolithic is characterised by the Pleistocene pattern of cyclic warmer and colder periods, including eight major cycles and numerous shorter episodes. The northern maximum of human occupation fluctuated in response to the changing conditions, and successful settlement required constant adaption capabilities and problem solving. Most of Scandinavia, the North European Plain and Russia remained off limits for occupation during the Paleolithic and Mesolithic. Populations were sparse and small throughout the Palaeolithic.

Associated evidence, such as stone tools, artifacts and settlement localities, numbers more than fossilised remains of the hominin occupants themselves. The simplest pebble tools with a few flakes struck off to create an edge were found in Dmanisi, Georgia, and in Spain at sites in the Guadix-Baza basin and near Atapuerca. The Oldowan tool discoveries, called Mode 1-type assemblages are gradually replaced by a more complex tradition that included a range of hand axes and flake tools, the Acheulean, Mode 2-type assemblages. Both types of tool sets are attributed to Homo erectus, the earliest and for a very long time the only human in Europe and more likely to be found in the southern part of the continent. However, the Acheulean fossil record also links to the emergence of Homo heidelbergensis, particularly its specific lithic tools and handaxes. The presence of Homo heidelbergensis is documented since 600,000 BC in numerous sites in Germany, Great Britain and northern France.

Although palaeoanthropologists generally agree that Homo erectus and Homo heidelbergensis immigrated to Europe, debates remain about migration routes and the chronology.

The fact that Homo neanderthalensis is found only in a contiguous range in Eurasia and the general acceptance of the Out of Africa hypothesis both suggest that the species evolved locally. Again, consensus prevails on the matter, but origin and evolution patterns are widely debated.

The Neanderthal fossil record ranges from Western Europe to the Altai Mountains in Central Asia and the Ural Mountains in the North to the Levant in the South. Unlike its predecessors, they were biologically and culturally adapted to survival in cold environments and successfully extended their range to the glacial environments of Central Europe and the Russian plains. The great number and, in some cases, exceptional state of preservation of Neanderthal fossils and cultural assemblages enables researchers to provide a detailed and accurate data on behaviour and culture. Neanderthals are associated with the Mousterian culture (Mode 3), stone tools that first appeared approximately 160,000 years ago.

=== Upper Paleolithic ===
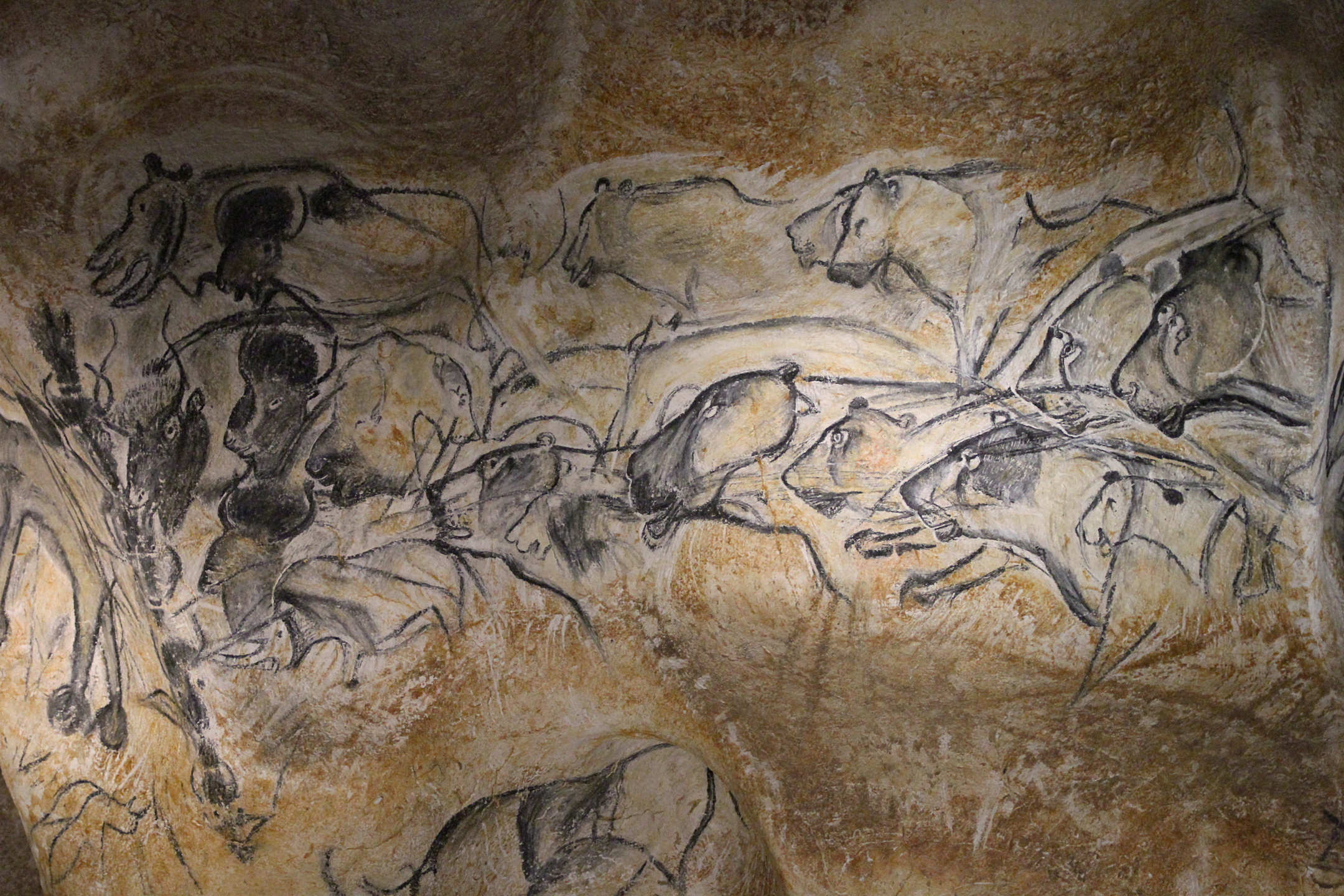
Chauvet Cave painting, Aurignacian culture, France, c. 30,000 BC

Homo sapiens arrived in Europe around 46,000 and 43,000 years ago via the Levant and entered the continent through the Danubian corridor, as the fossils at the sites of Bacho Kiro cave and Peștera cu Oase suggest. With an approximate age of 46,000 years, the Homo sapiens fossils found in Bacho Kiro cave consist of a pair of fragmented mandibles including at least one molar This site yielded the oldest known ornaments in Europe, radiocarbon dated to over 43,000 years ago.

The fossils' genetic structure indicates a recent Neanderthal ancestry and the discovery of a fragment of a skull in Israel in 2008 support the notion that humans interbred with Neanderthals in the Levant.

After the slow processes of the previous hundreds of thousands of years, a turbulent period of Neanderthal–Homo sapiens coexistence demonstrated that cultural evolution had replaced biological evolution as the primary force of adaptation and change in human societies.

Generally small and widely dispersed fossil sites suggest that Neanderthals lived in less numerous and more socially isolated groups than Homo sapiens. Tools and Levallois points are remarkably sophisticated from the outset, but they have a slow rate of variability, and general technological inertia is noticeable during the entire fossil period. Artifacts are of utilitarian nature, and symbolic behavioral traits are undocumented before the arrival of modern humans. The Aurignacian culture, introduced by modern humans, is characterized by cut bone or antler points and fine flint blades and bladelets struck from prepared cores, rather than using crude flakes. The oldest examples and subsequent widespread tradition of prehistoric art also come from the Aurignacian.

After more than 100,000 years of uniformity, around 45,000 years ago, the Neanderthal fossil record changed abruptly. The Mousterian had quickly become more versatile and was named the Chatelperronian culture, which signifies the diffusion of Aurignacian elements into Neanderthal culture. Although debated, the fact proved that Neanderthals had, to some extent, adopted the culture of modern Homo sapiens. However, the Neanderthal fossil record completely vanished after 40,000 years BC, but genetic studies show mixing may have been common in the prehistoric period, and modern Europeans all have Neanderthal DNA..

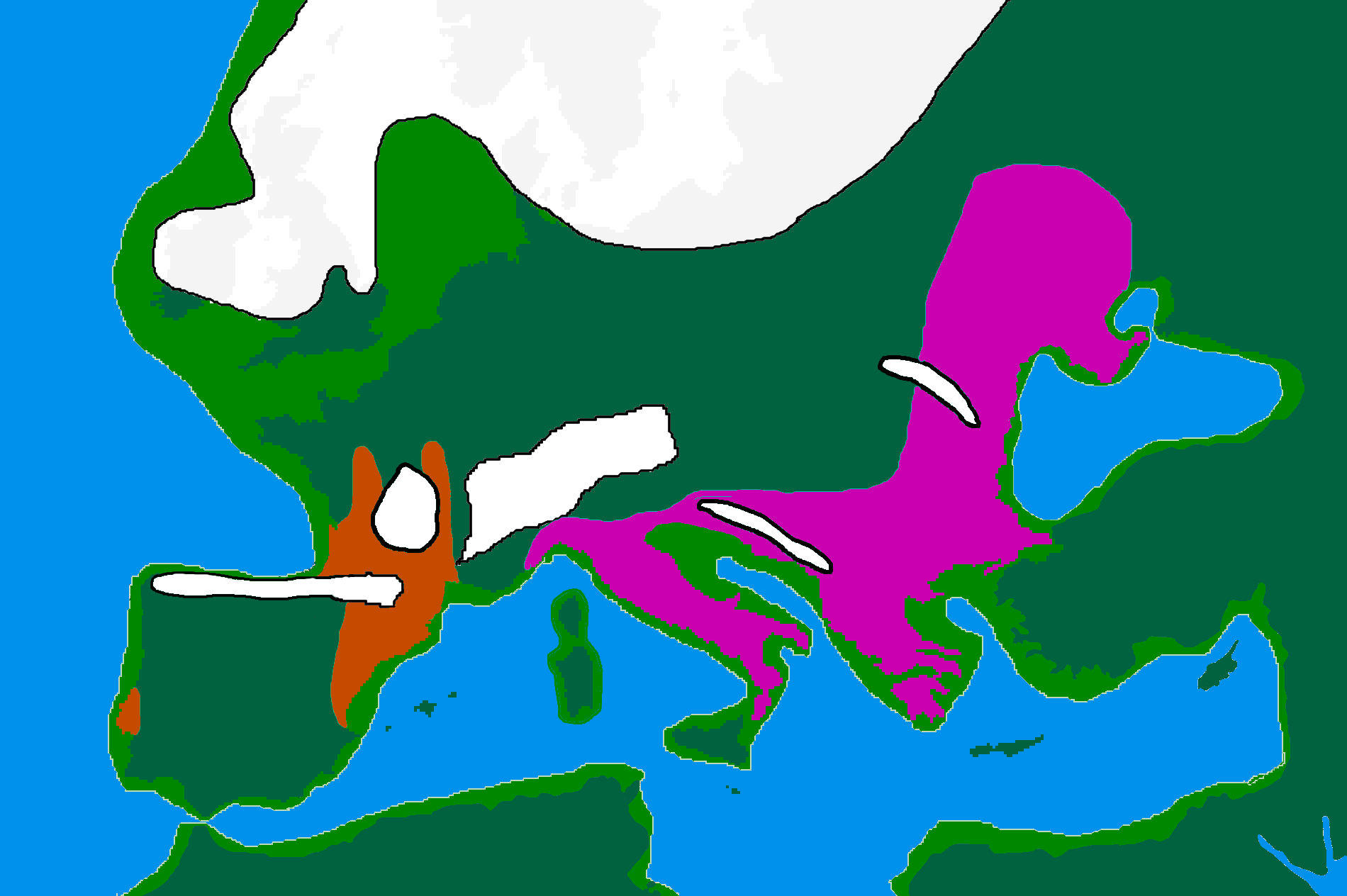
Last Glacial Maximum refugia, c. 20,000 years ago Solutrean Epigravettian

Around 32,000 years ago, the Gravettian culture appeared in the Crimean Mountains (southern Ukraine). By 24,000 BC, the Solutrean and Gravettian cultures were present in Southwestern Europe. Gravettian technology and culture have been theorised to have come with migrations of people from the Middle East, Anatolia and the Balkans, and might be linked with the transitional cultures mentioned earlier since their techniques have some similarities and are both very different from Aurignacian ones, but this issue is very obscure. The Gravettian also appeared in the Caucasus and Zagros Mountains but soon disappeared from southwestern Europe, with the notable exception of the Mediterranean coasts of Iberia.

The Solutrean culture, extended from northern Spain to southeastern France, includes not only a stone technology but also the first significant development of cave painting and the use of the needle and possibly that of the bow and arrow. The more widespread Gravettian culture is no less advanced, at least in artistic terms: sculpture (mainly venuses) is the most outstanding form of creative expression of such peoples.

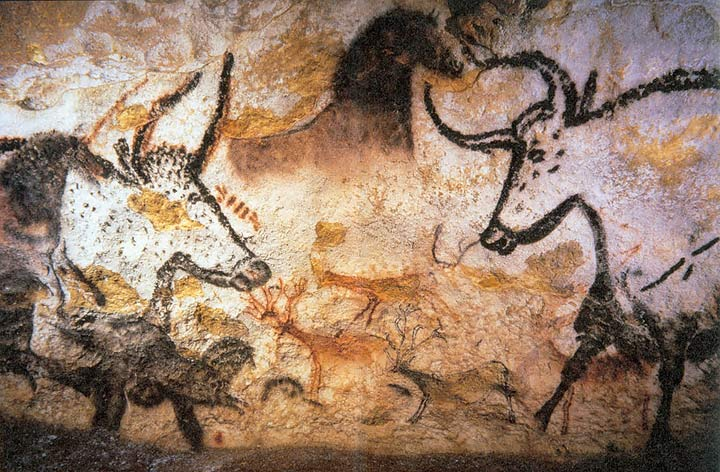
Lascaux cave painting, Magdalenian, 15,000 BC

Around 19,000 BC, Europe witnesses the appearance of a new culture, known as Magdalenian, possibly rooted in the old Aurignacian one, which soon superseded the Solutrean area and also the Gravettian of Central Europe. However, in Mediterranean Iberia, Italy, the Balkans and Anatolia, Epigravettian cultures continued to evolve locally.

With the Magdalenian culture, the Paleolithic development in Europe reaches its peak and this is reflected in art, owing to previous traditions of paintings and sculpture.

Around 12,500 BC, the Würm Glacial Age ended. Slowly, through the following millennia, temperatures and sea levels rose, changing the environment of prehistoric people. Ireland and Great Britain became islands, and Scandinavia became separated from the main part of the European Peninsula. (They had all once been connected by a now-submerged region of the continental shelf known as Doggerland.) Nevertheless, the Magdalenian culture persisted until 10,000 BC, when it quickly evolved into two microlith cultures: Azilian, in Spain and southern France, and Sauveterrian, in northern France and Central Europe. Despite some differences, both cultures shared several traits: the creation of very small stone tools called microliths and the scarcity of figurative art, which seems to have vanished almost completely, which was replaced by abstract decoration of tools.

In the late phase of the epi-Paleolithic period, the Sauveterrean culture evolved into the so-called Tardenoisian and strongly influenced its southern neighbour, clearly replacing it in Mediterranean Spain and Portugal. The recession of the glaciers allowed human colonisation in Northern Europe for the first time. The Maglemosian culture, derived from the Sauveterre-Tardenois culture but with a strong personality, colonised Denmark and the nearby regions, including parts of Britain.

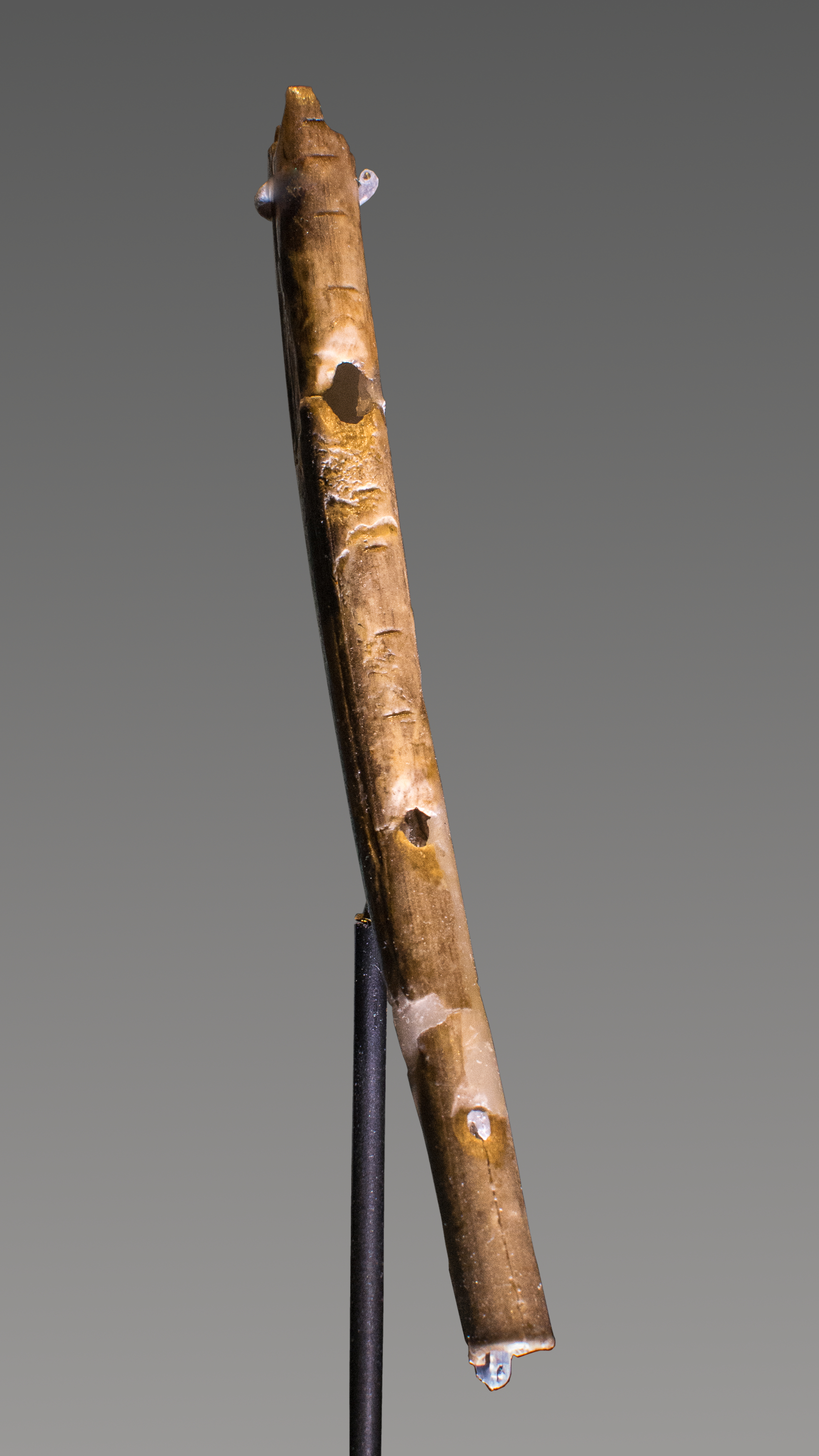
Bone flute, Aurignacian, Geissenklösterle cave, 43,000 BC

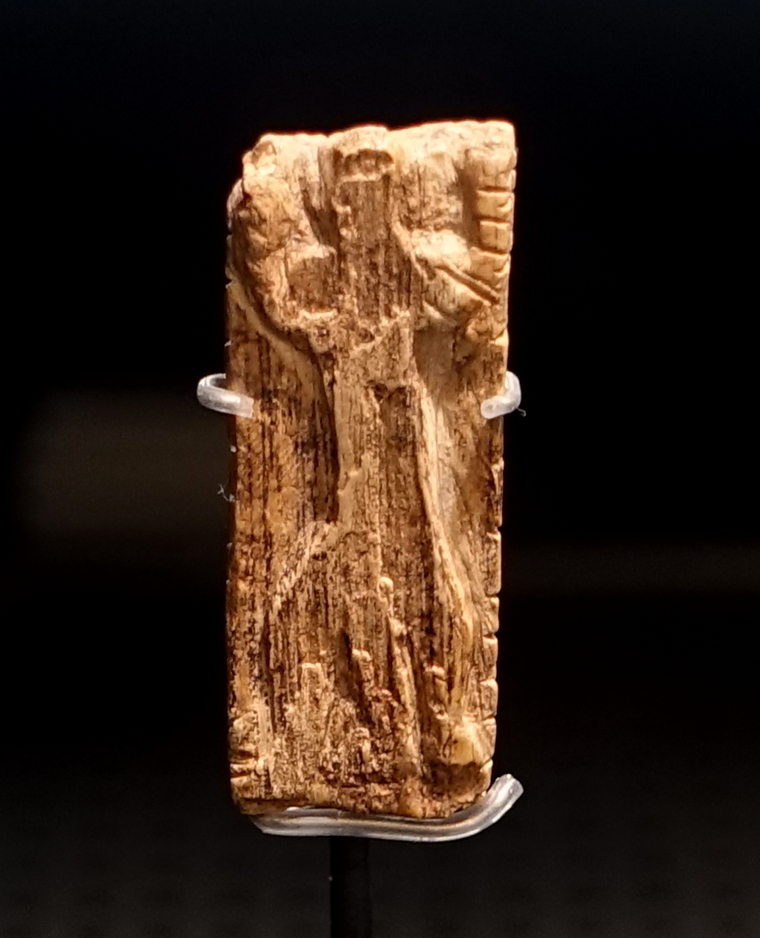
Adorant from the Geißenklösterle cave, Aurignacian, 42,000 to 40,000 BC

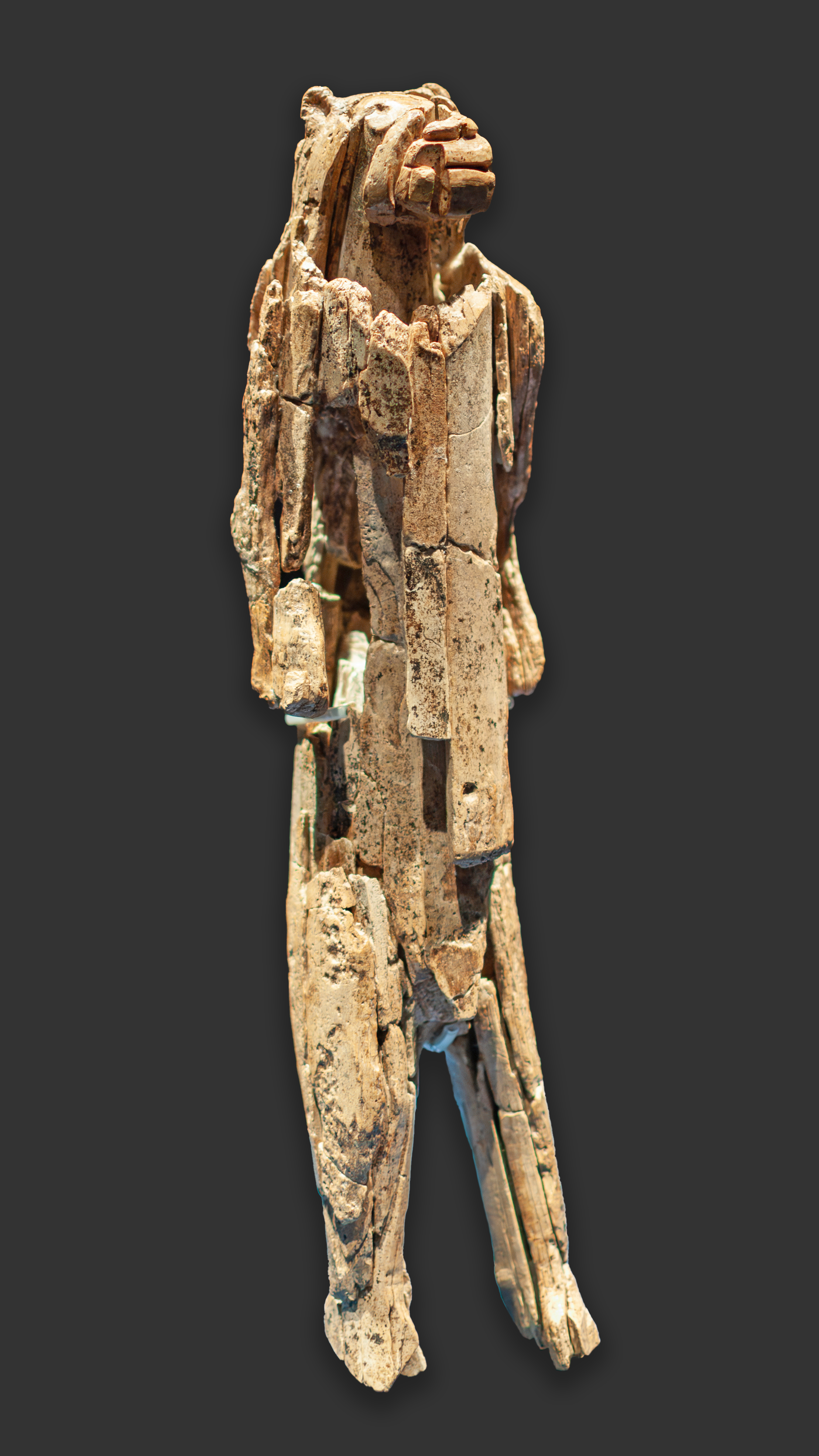
Lion-man, Aurignacian, c. 41,000 to 35,000 BC

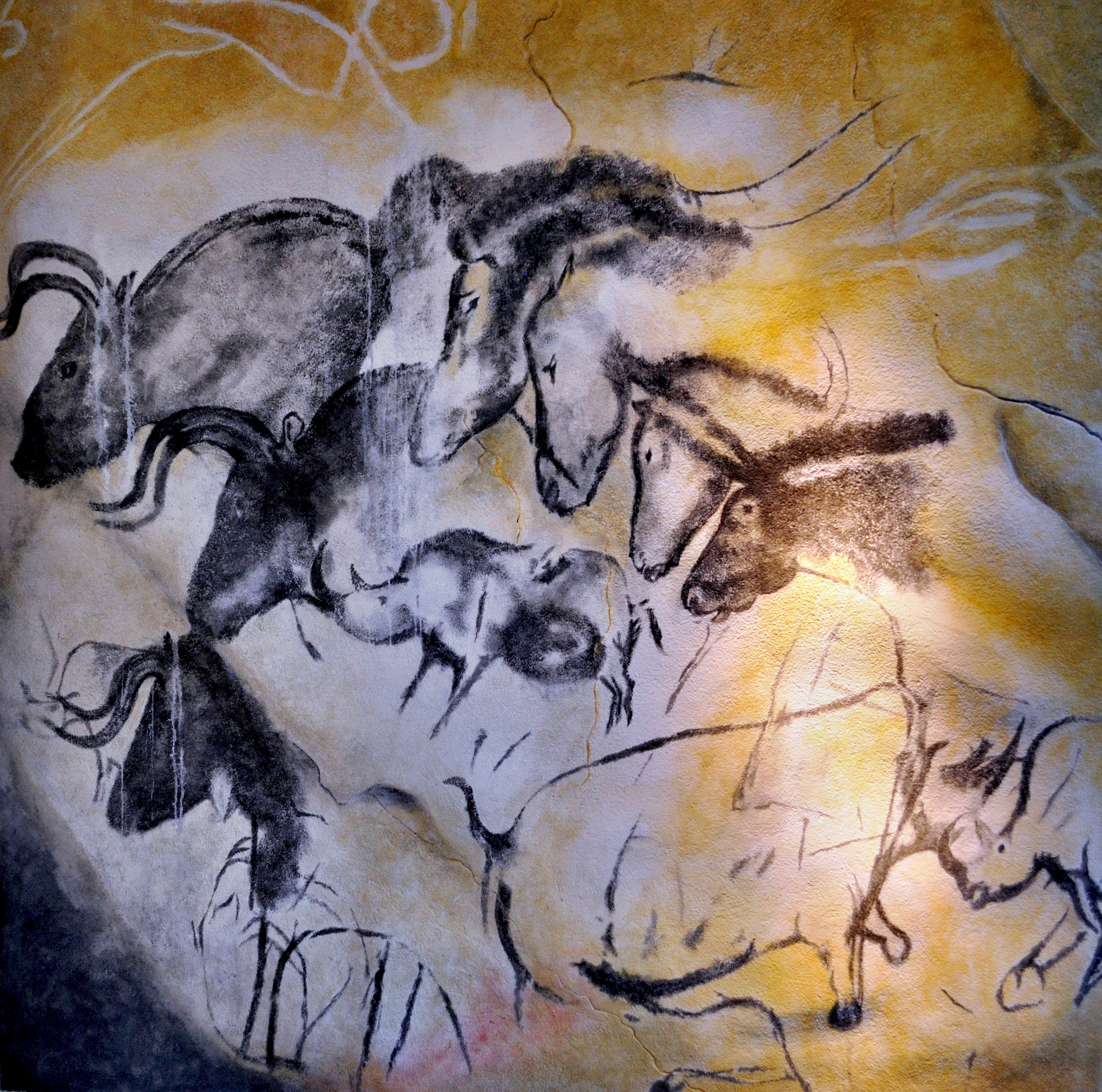
Aurignacian cave paintings, Chauvet Cave, c. 30,000 BC

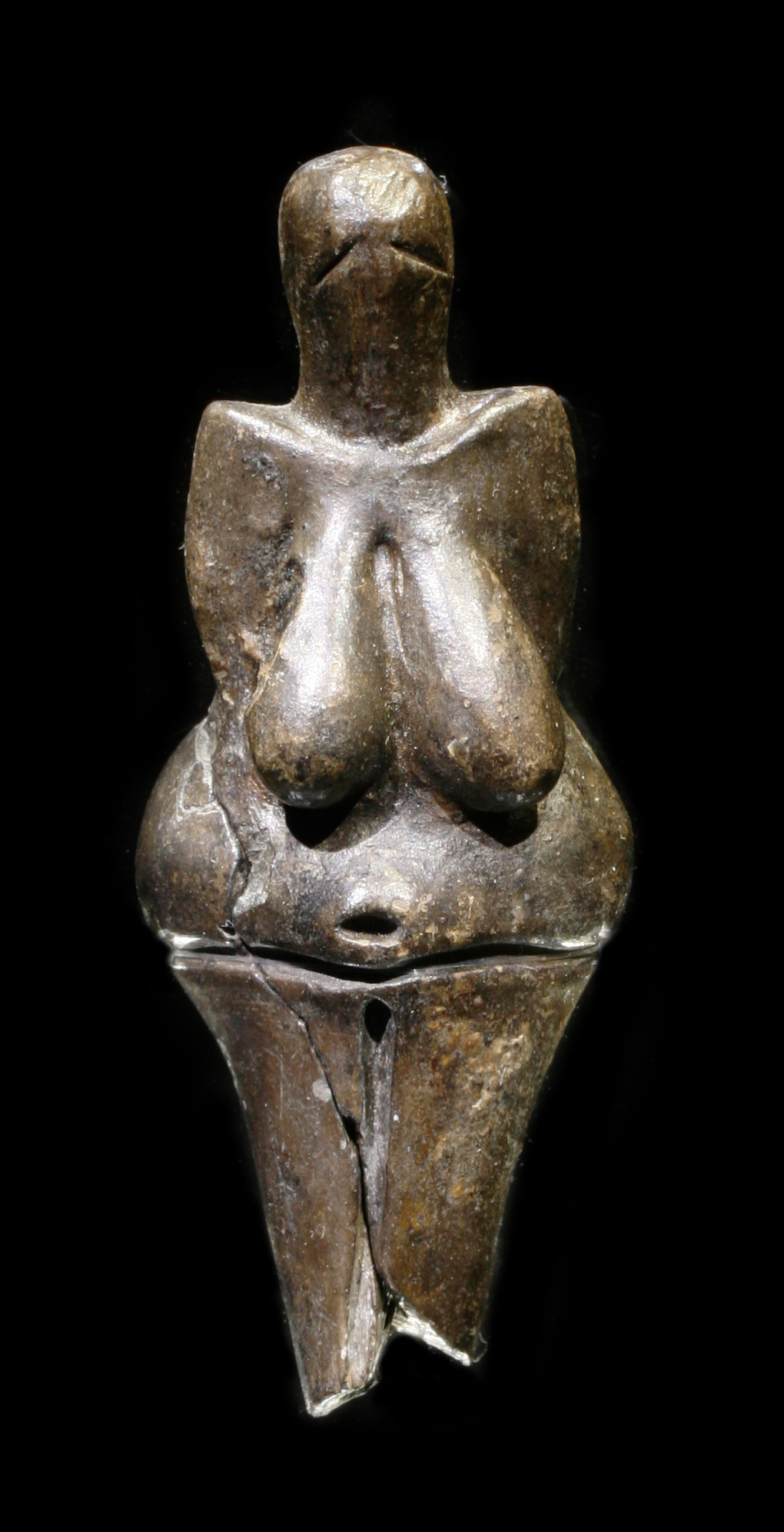
Venus of Dolní Věstonice, Gravettian, c. 29,000 BC

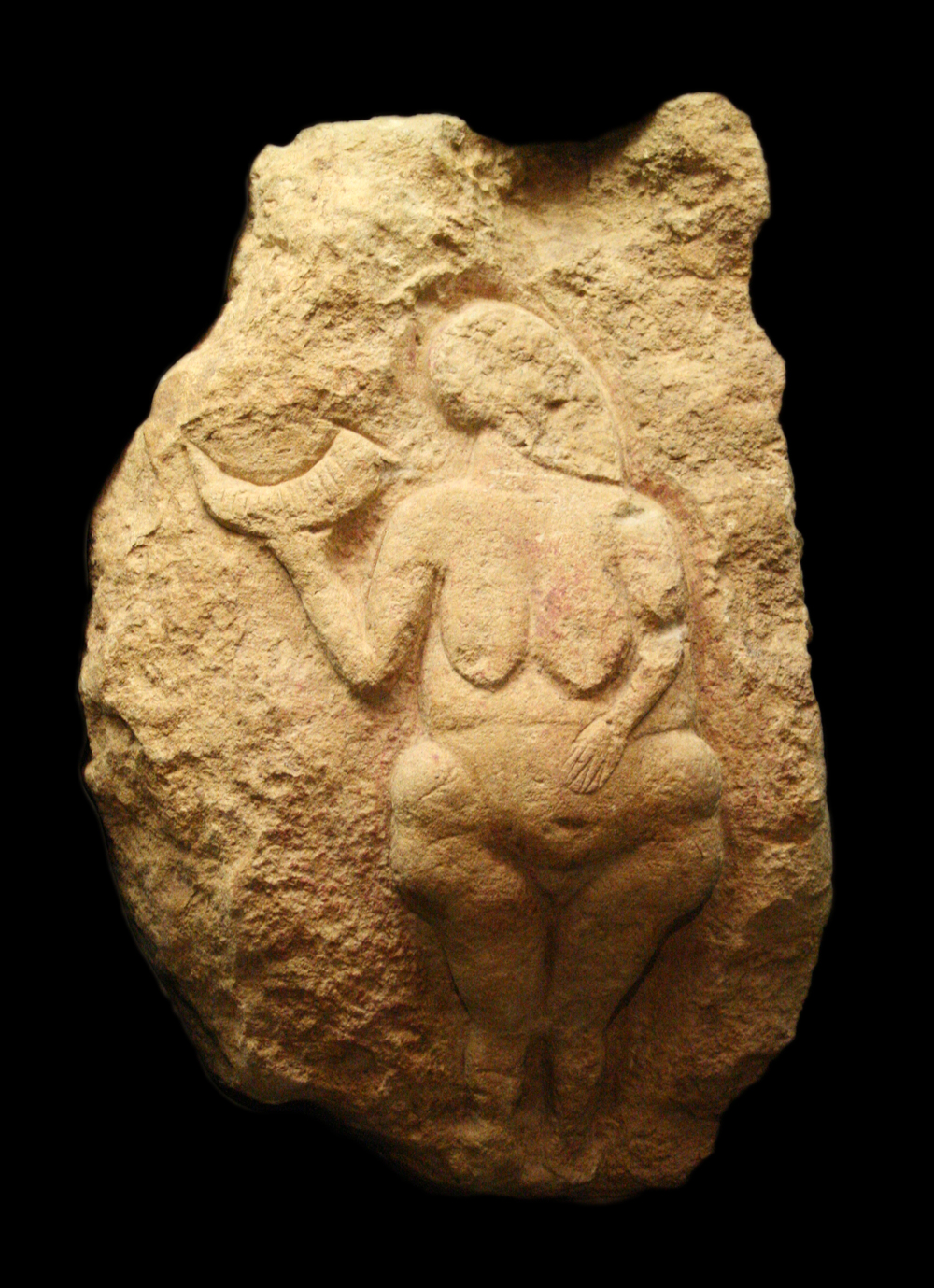
Venus of Laussel, Gravettian, c. 23,000 BC

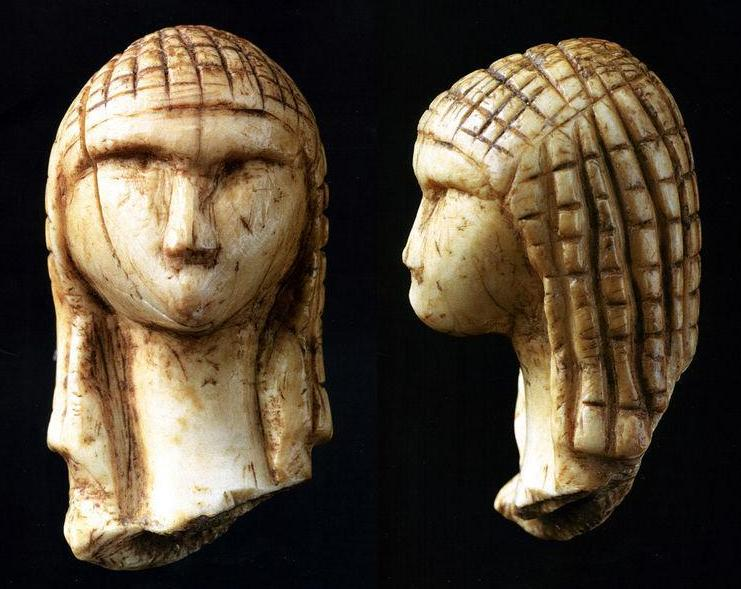
Venus of Brassempouy, c. 23,000 BC

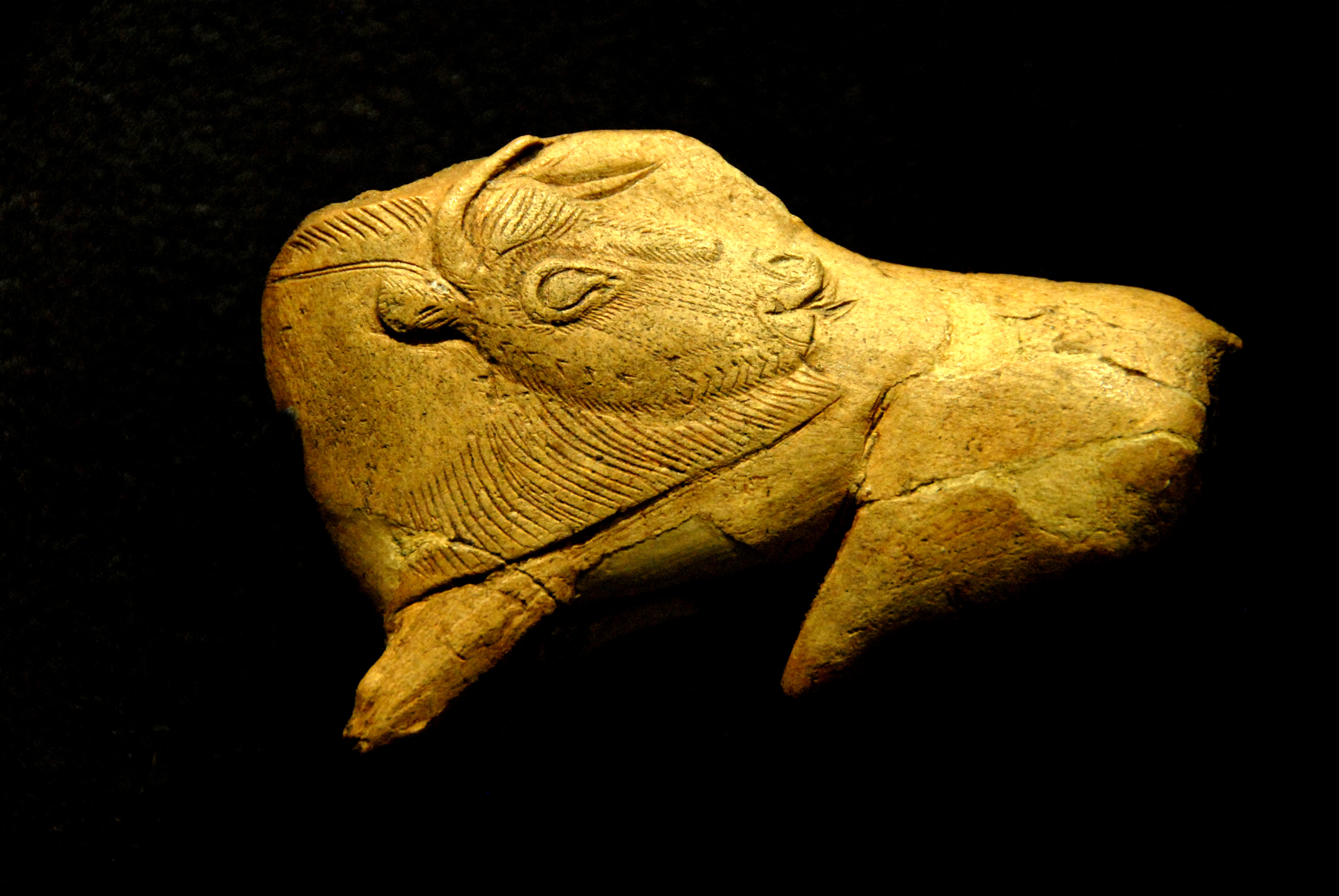
Antler carving, Magdalenian, 15,000 BC

=== Mesolithic (Middle Stone Age) ===
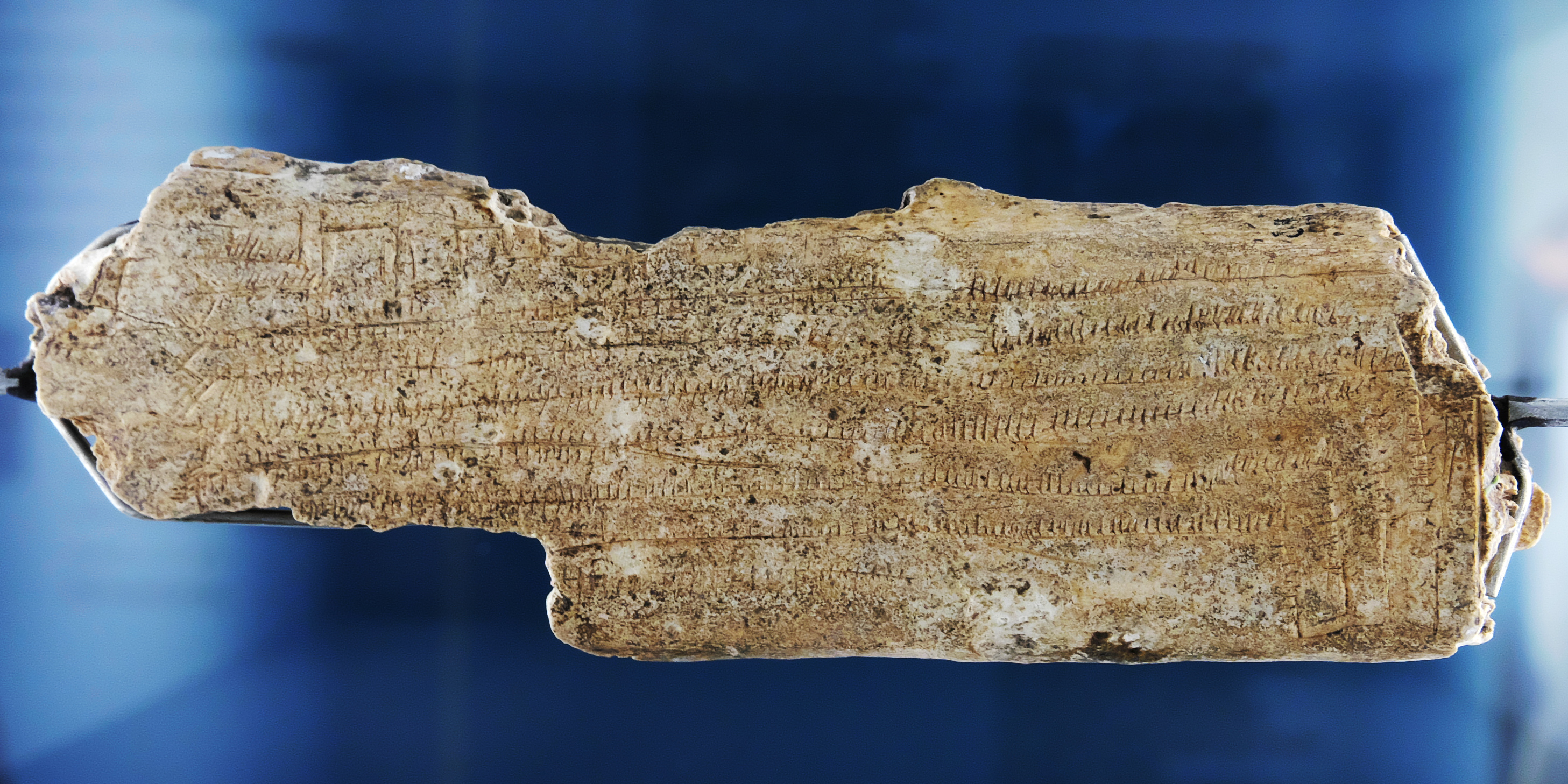
Thaïs bone, France, Azilian culture, c. 10,000 BC

A transition period in the development of human technology between the Paleolithic and the Neolithic, the Balkan Mesolithic began around 15,000 years ago. In Western Europe, the Early Mesolithic, or Azilian, began about 14,000 years ago, in the Franco-Cantabrian region of northern Spain and southern France. In other parts of Europe, the Mesolithic began by 11,500 years ago (the beginning Holocene) and ended with the introduction of farming, which, depending on the region, occurred 8,500 to 5,500 years ago.

In areas with limited glacial impact, the term "Epipaleolithic" is sometimes preferred for the period. Regions that experienced greater environmental effects as the Last Glacial Period ended had a much more apparent Mesolithic era that lasted millennia. In Northern Europe, societies were able to live well on rich food supplies from the marshlands, which had been created by the warmer climate. Such conditions produced distinctive human behaviours that are preserved in the material record, such as the Maglemosian and Azilian cultures. Such conditions delayed the coming of the Neolithic to as late as 5,500 years ago in Northern Europe.

As what Vere Gordon Childe termed the "Neolithic Package" (including agriculture, herding, polished stone axes, timber longhouses and pottery) spread into Europe, the Mesolithic way of life was marginalised and eventually disappeared. Controversy over the means of that dispersal is discussed below in the Neolithic section. A "Ceramic Mesolithic" can be distinguished between 7,200 and 5,850 years ago and ranged from Southern to Northern Europe.

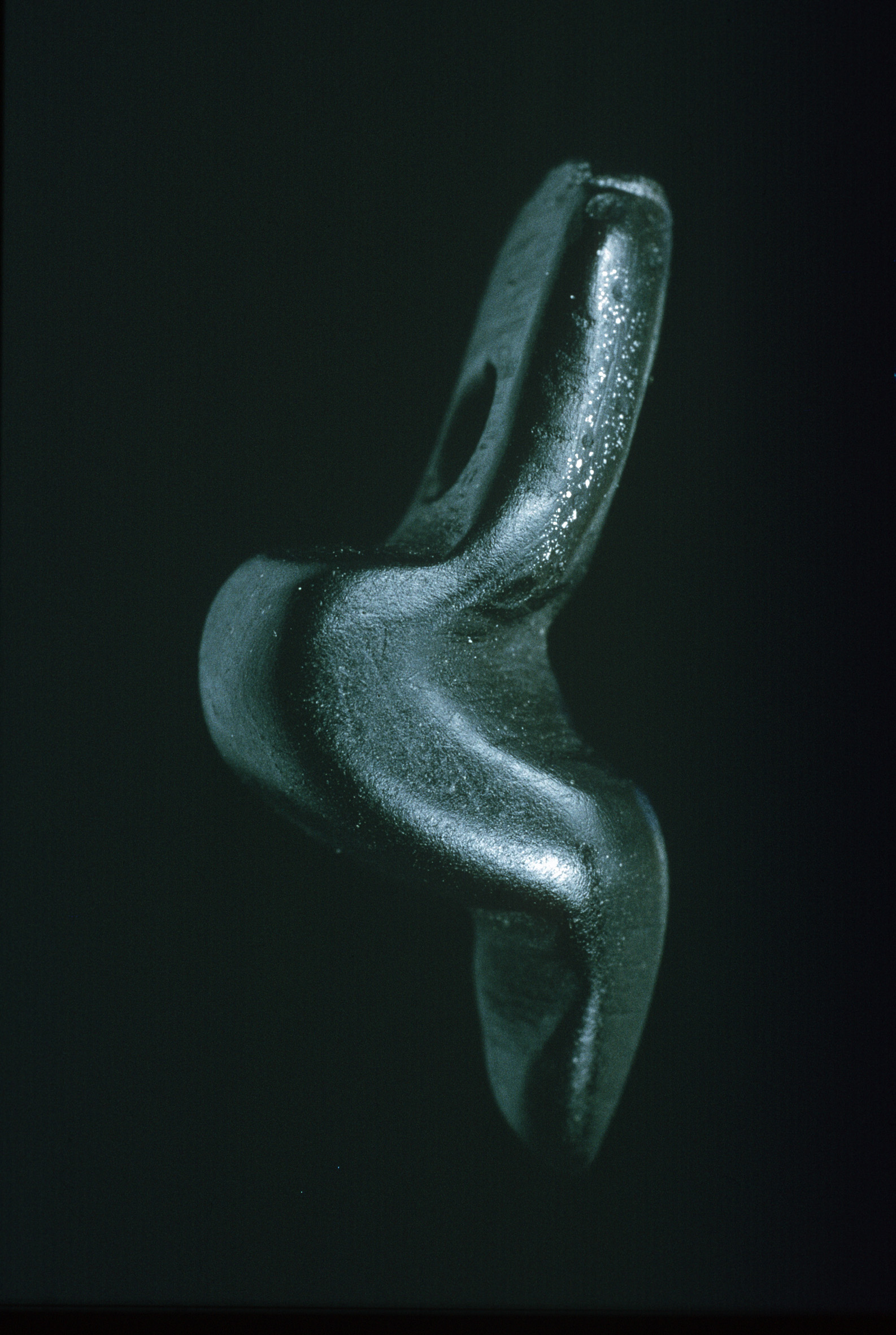
Venus of Monruz, Switzerland, c. 9000 BC

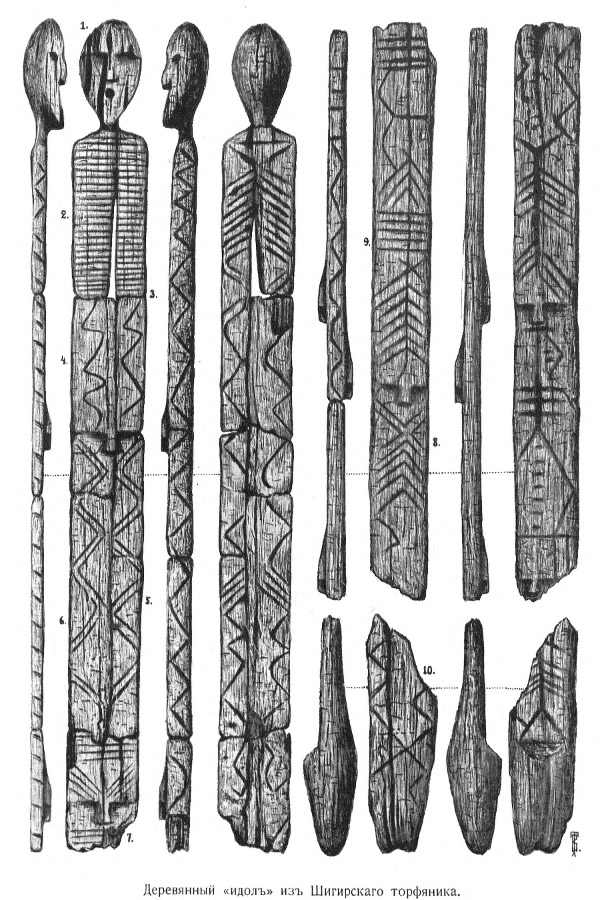
Shigir Idol, Russia, c. 10,000 BC

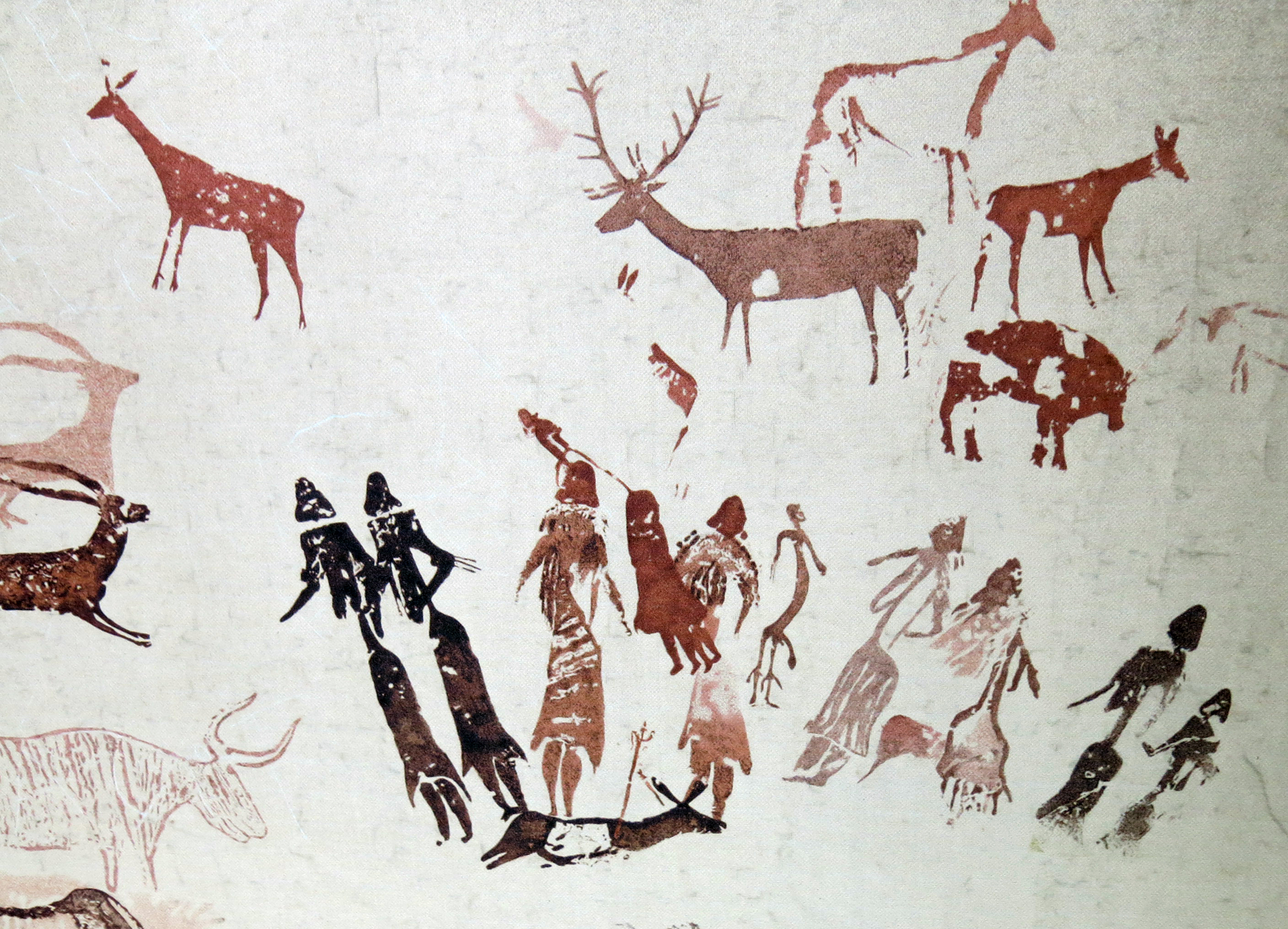
Roca dels Moros, Spain

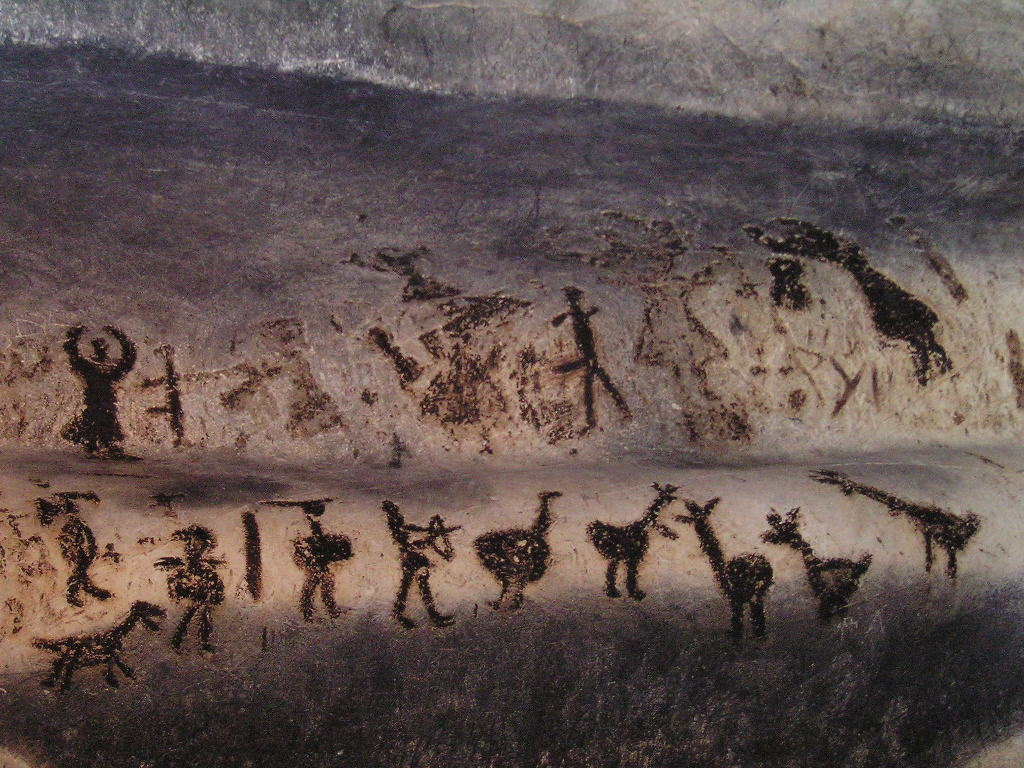
Magura Cave drawings, Bulgaria, c. 8,000- 6,000 BC

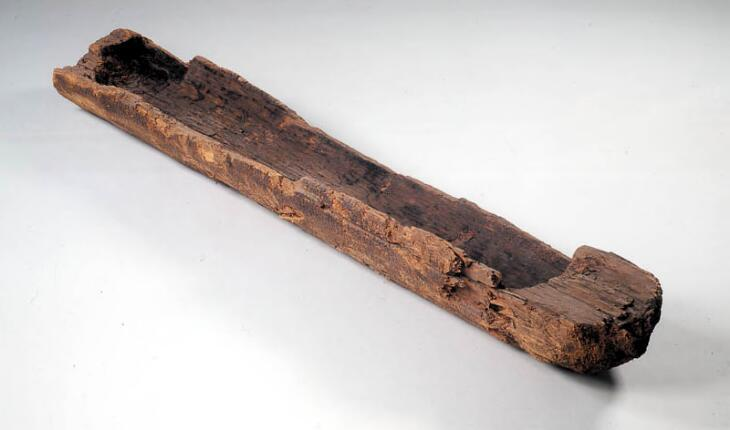
Pesse canoe, Netherlands, c. 8000 BC

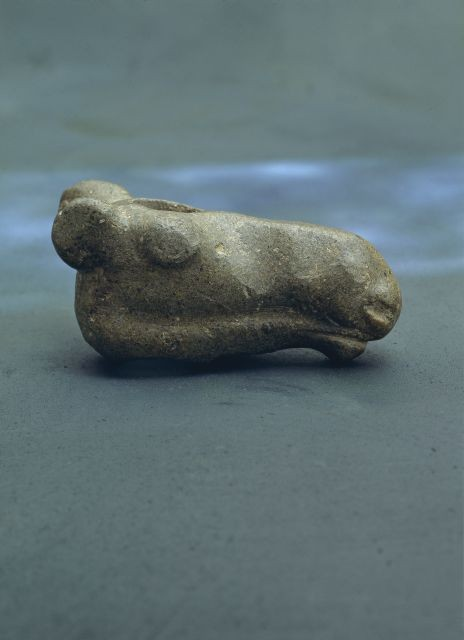
Elk's Head of Huittinen, Finland, c. 6500 BC

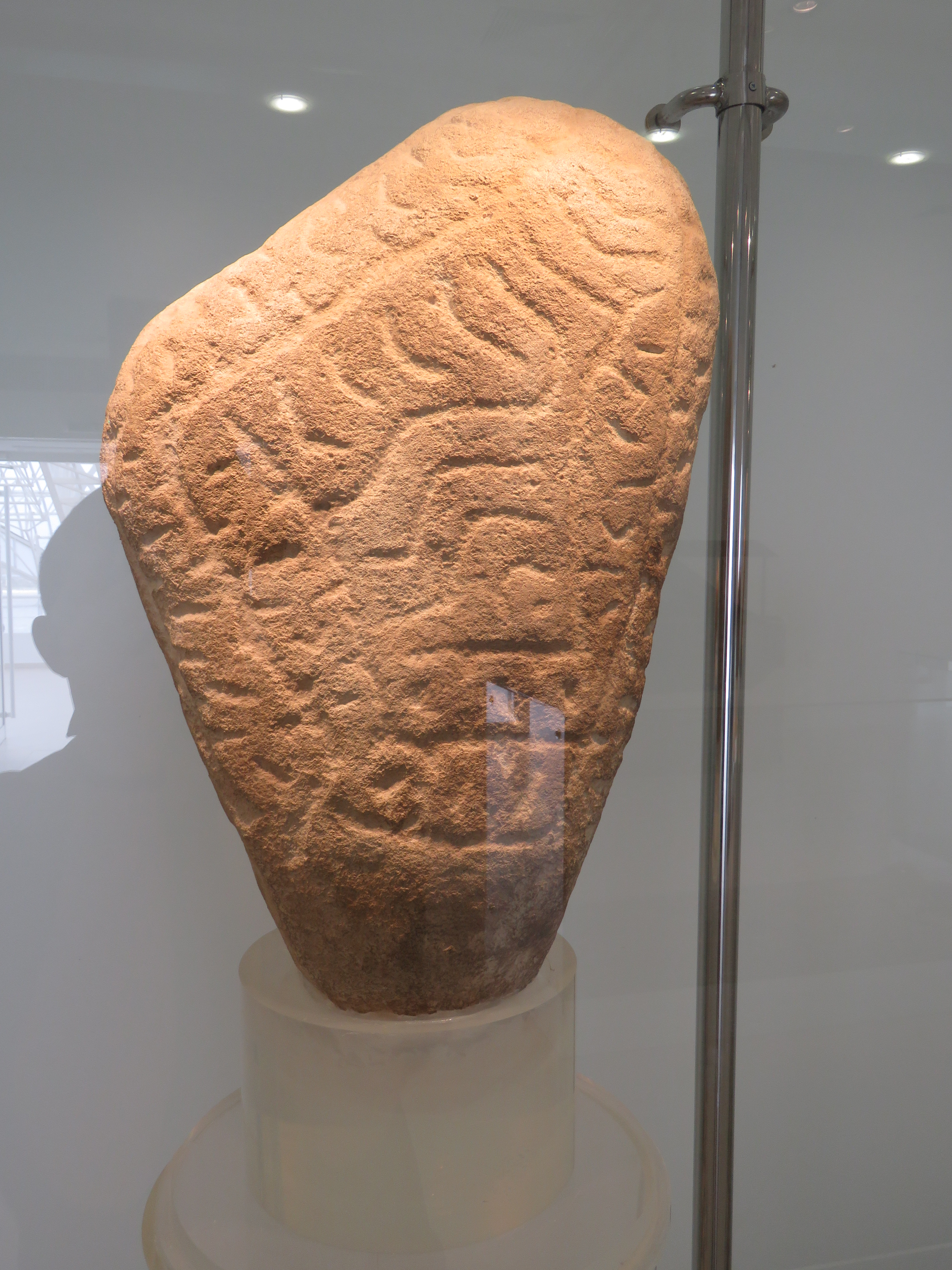
Lepenski Vir sculpture, Serbia, c. 7000 BC

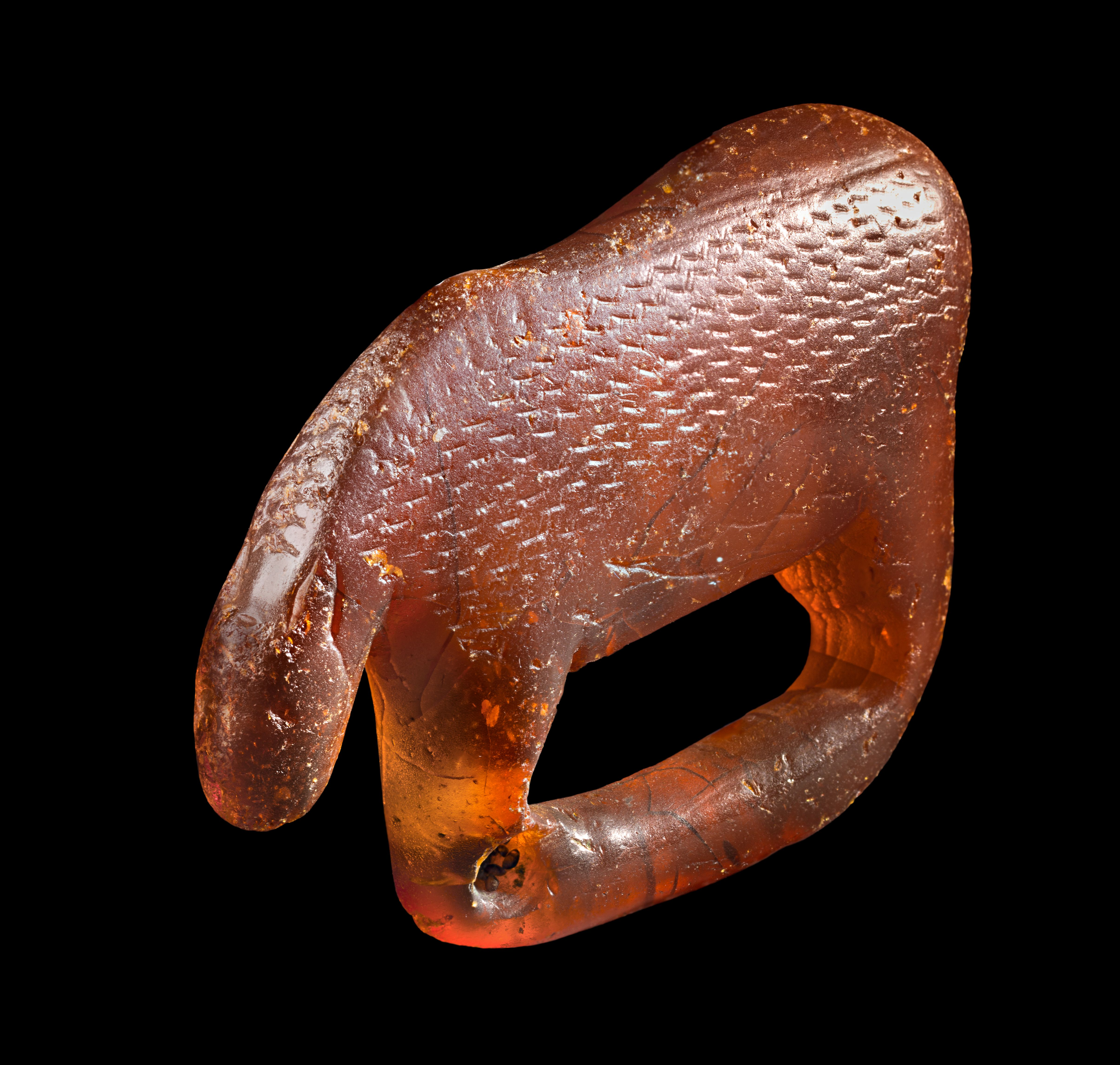
Amber animal figurine, Denmark, c. 12,000 BC

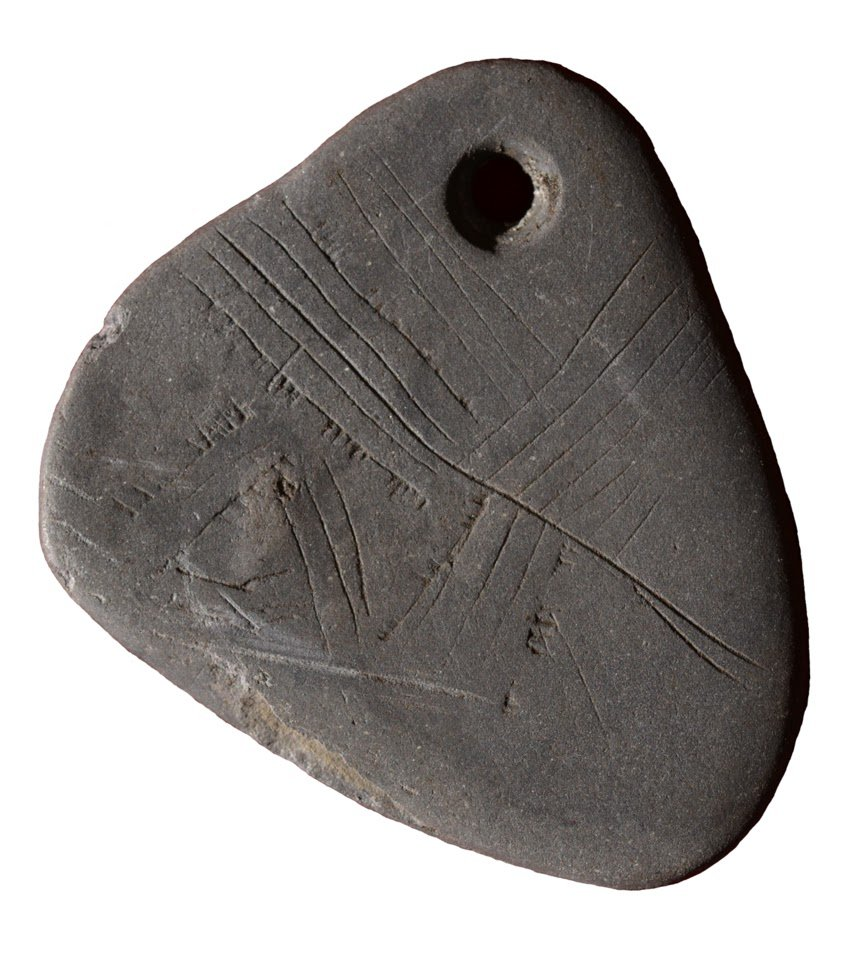
Star Carr pendant, Britain, c. 9000 BC

== Neolithic (New Stone Age) ==
Chronology of agriculture introduction in Europe

The European Neolithic is assumed to have arrived from the Near East via Asia Minor, the Mediterranean and the Caucasus. There has been a long discussion between migrationists, who claim that the Near Eastern farmers almost totally displaced the European native hunter-gatherers, and diffusionists, who claim that the process was slow enough to have occurred mostly through cultural transmission. A relationship has been suggested between the spread of agriculture and the diffusion of Indo-European languages, with several models of migrations trying to establish a relationship, like the Anatolian hypothesis, which sets the origin of Indo-European agricultural terminology in Anatolia, though the Kurgan hypothesis suggesting that the Indo-European languages didn't enter Europe until thousands of years later has been more widely supported in recent years.

=== Early Neolithic ===
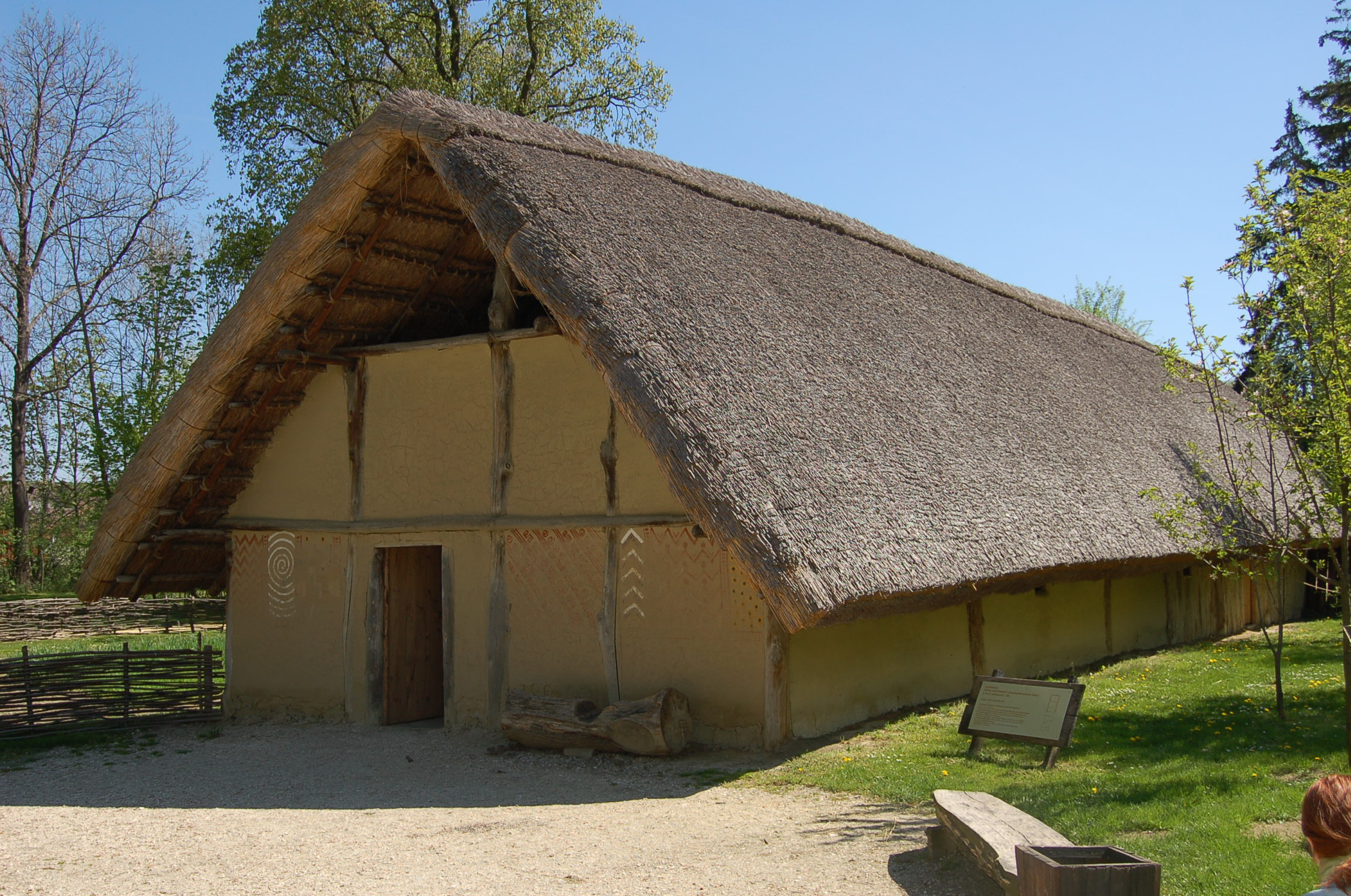
Neolithic longhouses appeared in central Europe in connection with the early Neolithic cultures such as the Linear Pottery culture or Cucuteni culture.

Apparently related with the Anatolian culture of Hacilar, the Greek region of Thessaly was the first place in Europe known to have acquired agriculture, cattle-herding and pottery. The early stages are known as pre-Sesklo culture. The Thessalian Neolithic culture soon evolved into the more coherent Sesklo culture (6000 BC), which was the origin of the main branches of Neolithic expansion in Europe. The Karanovo culture on the territory of modern day Bulgaria, was another early Neolithic culture (Karanovo I-III ca. 62nd to 55th centuries BC) which was part of the Danube civilization and it is considered the largest and most important of the Azmak River Valley agrarian settlements. The Karanovo I is considered a continuation of Near Eastern settlement type. The Starčevo culture is dating to the period between c. 6200 and 4500 BCE. It originates in the spread of the Neolithic package of peoples and technological innovations including farming and ceramics from Anatolia. The Starčevo culture marks its spread to the inland Balkan peninsula as the Cardial ware culture did along the Adriatic coastline. It forms part of the wider Starčevo–Körös–Criş culture. Practically all of the Balkan Peninsula was colonized in the 6th millennium from there. The expansion, reaching the easternmost Tardenoisian outposts of the upper Tisza, gave birth to the Proto-Linear Pottery culture, a significant modification of the Balkan Neolithic that was the origin of one of the most important branches of European Neolithic: the Danubian group of cultures. In parallel, the coasts of the Adriatic and of southern Italy witnessed the expansion of another Neolithic current with less clear origins. Settling initially in Dalmatia, the bearers of the Cardium pottery culture may have come from Thessaly (some of the pre-Sesklo settlements show related traits) or even from Lebanon (Byblos). They were sailors, fishermen and sheep and goat herders, and the archaeological findings show that they mixed with natives in most places. Other early Neolithic cultures can be found in Ukraine and Southern Russia, where the Epigravettian locals assimilated cultural influxes from beyond the Caucasus (e.g. the Dniepr-Donets culture and related cultures) and in Andalusia (Spain), where the rare Neolithic of La Almagra Pottery appeared without known origins very early (c. 7800 BC).

=== Middle Neolithic ===
This phase, starting 7000 years ago was marked by the consolidation of the Neolithic expansion towards western and northern Europe but also by the rise of new cultures in the Balkans, notably the Dimini (Thessaly) and related Vinca (Serbia and Romania) and Karanovo cultures (Bulgaria and nearby areas). Meanwhile, the Proto-Linear Pottery culture gave birth to two very dynamic branches: the Western and Eastern Linear Pottery Cultures. The western branch expanded quickly, assimilating Germany, the Czech Republic, Poland and even large parts of western Ukraine, historical Moldavia, the lowlands of Romania, and regions of France, Belgium and the Netherlands, all in less than 1000 years. With this expansion came diversification and a number of local Danubian cultures started forming at the end of the 5th millennium. In the Mediterranean, the Cardium pottery fishermen showed no less dynamism and colonised or assimilated all of Italy and the Mediterranean regions of France and Spain. Even in the Atlantic, some groups among the native hunter-gatherers started the slow incorporation of the new technologies. Among them, the most noticeable regions seem to be southwestern Iberia, which was influenced by the Mediterranean but especially by the Andalusian Neolithic, which soon developed the first Megalithic burials (dolmens), and the area around Denmark (Ertebölle culture), influenced by the Danubian complex.

=== Late Neolithic ===
This period occupied the first half of the 6th millennium BC. The tendencies of the previous period consolidated and so there was a fully-formed Neolithic Europe, with five main cultural regions:

1. Danubian culture: from northern France to western Ukraine. Now split into several local cultures, the most relevant being the Boian culture, the Rössen culture that was pre-eminent in the west, and the Lengyel culture of Austria and western Hungary, which would have a major role in later periods.
2. The area of Dimini-Vinca: Thessaly, Macedonia and Serbia but extending its influence to parts of the mid-Danubian basin (Tisza, Slavonia) and southern Italy. Known as 'Old Europe'.
3. Mediterranean cultures: from the Adriatic to eastern Spain, including Italy and large portions of France and Switzerland. They were also diversified into several groups.
4. Eastern Europe: basically central and eastern Ukraine and parts of southern Russia and Belarus (Dniepr-Don culture). This area has the earliest evidence for domesticated horses.
5. Atlantic Europe: a mosaic of local cultures, some of them still pre-Neolithic, from Portugal to southern Sweden. In around 5800 BC, western France began to incorporate the Megalithic style of burial.
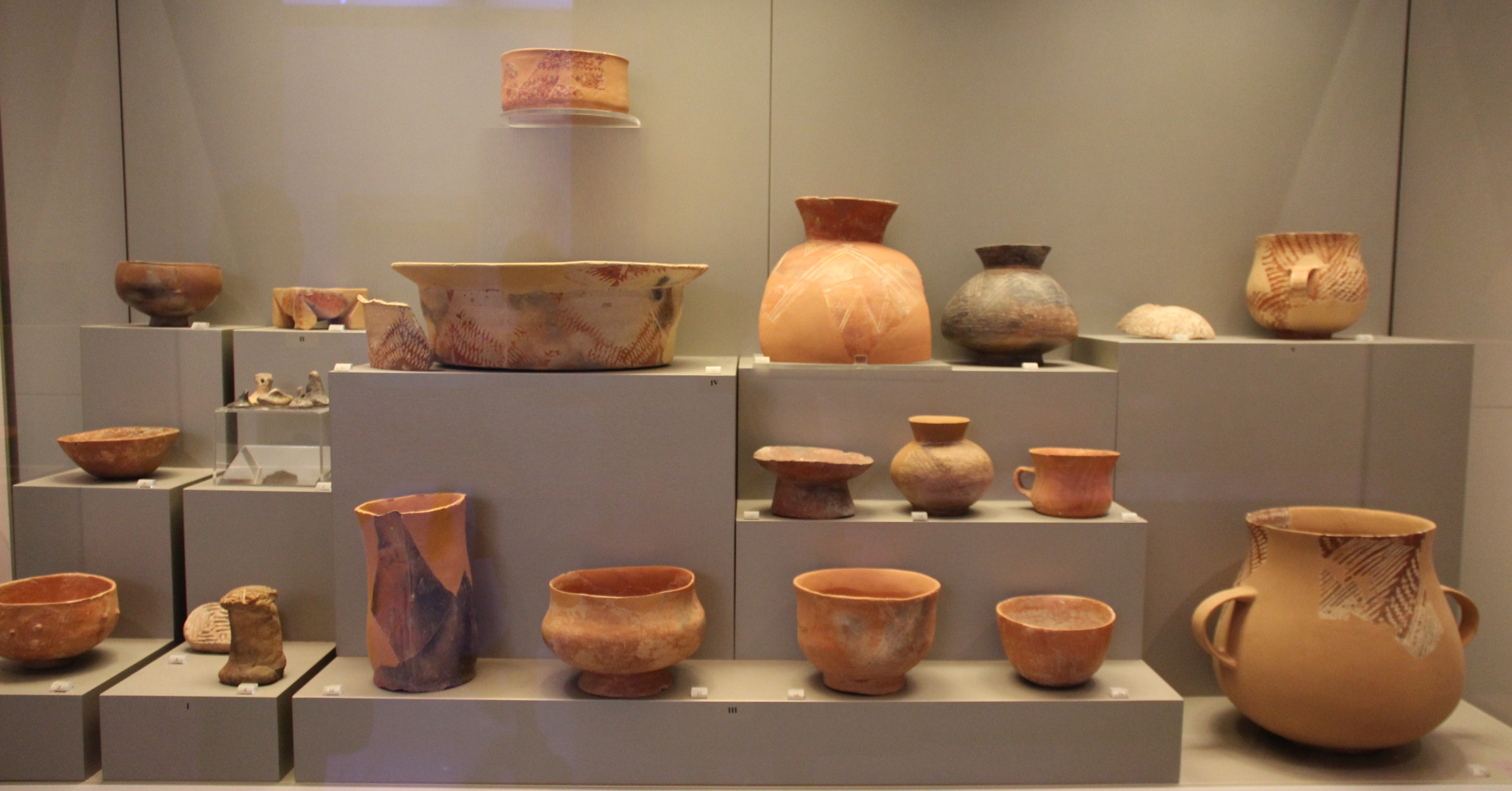
Sesklo culture, Greece, c. 6000-5300 BC

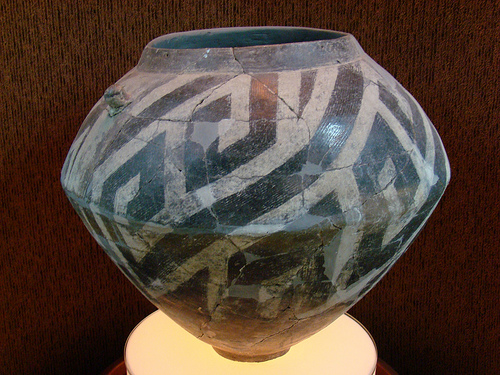
Karanovo culture, Bulgaria, 6th mill. BC

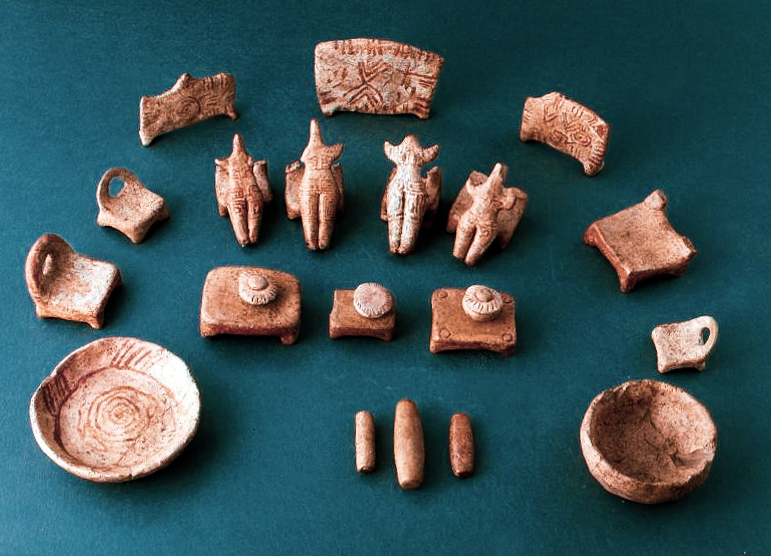
Karanovo culture, Bulgaria, 5th mill. BC

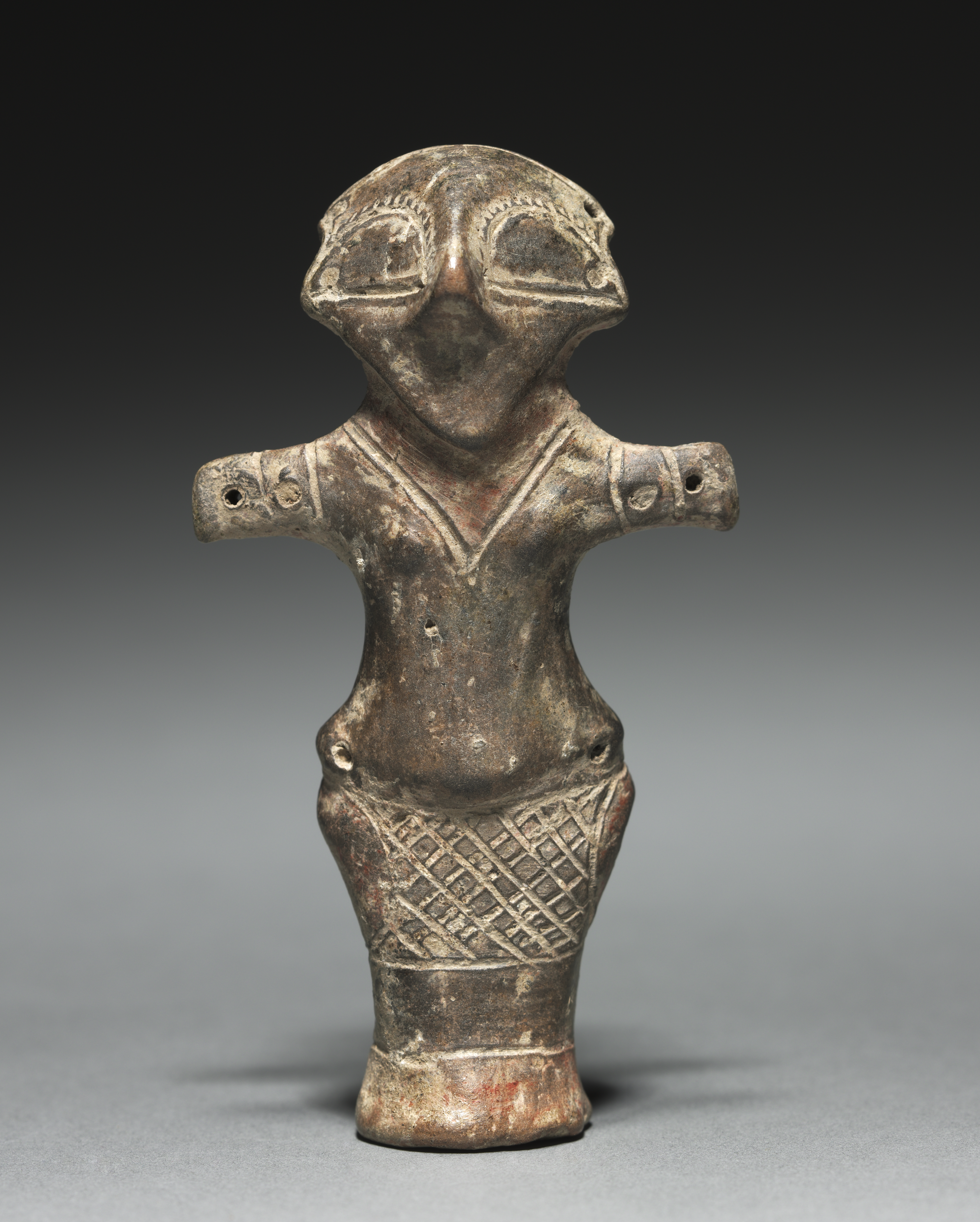
Vinča culture figurine, Serbia, c. 5000 BC

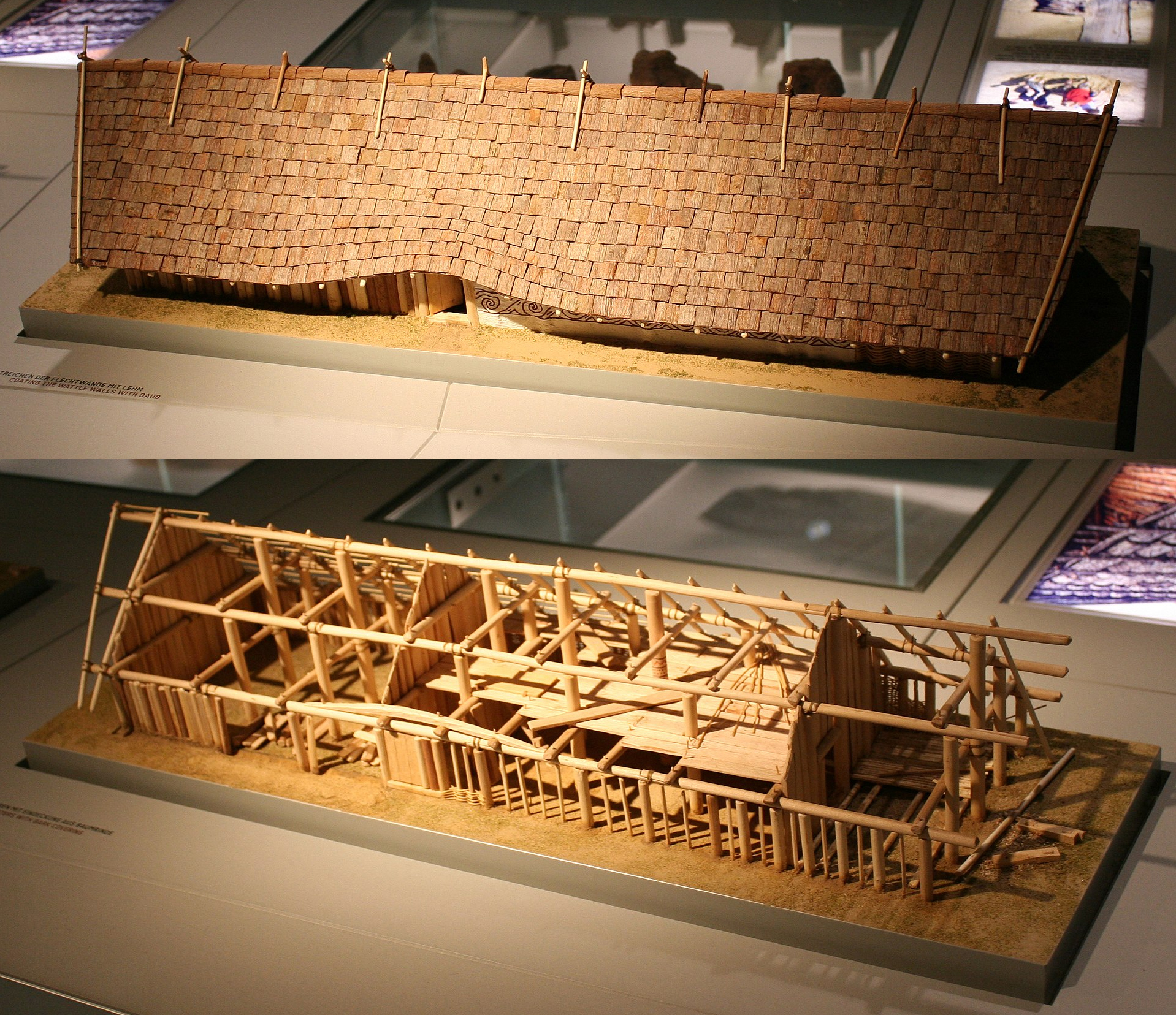
Linear Pottery culture, Germany, 5000 BC

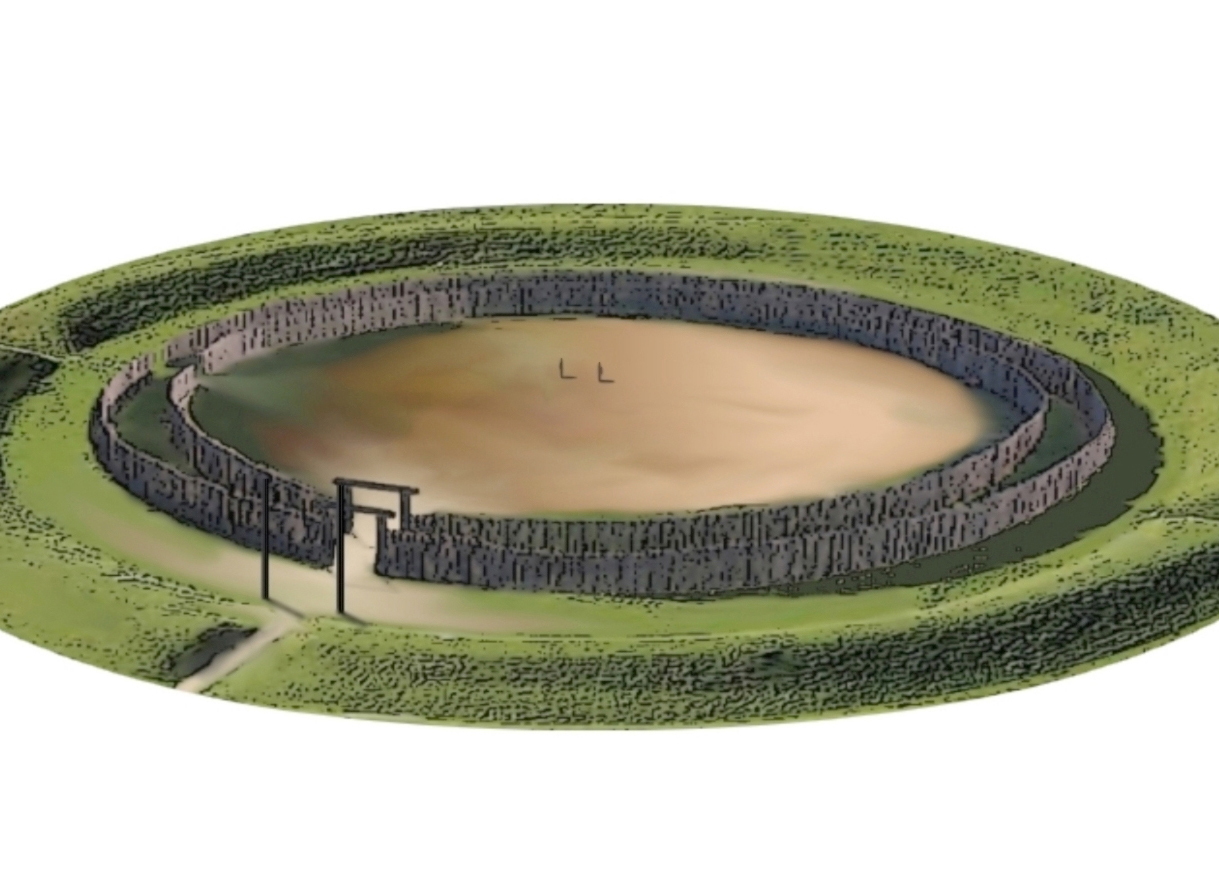
Goseck Circle, Germany, 4900 BC

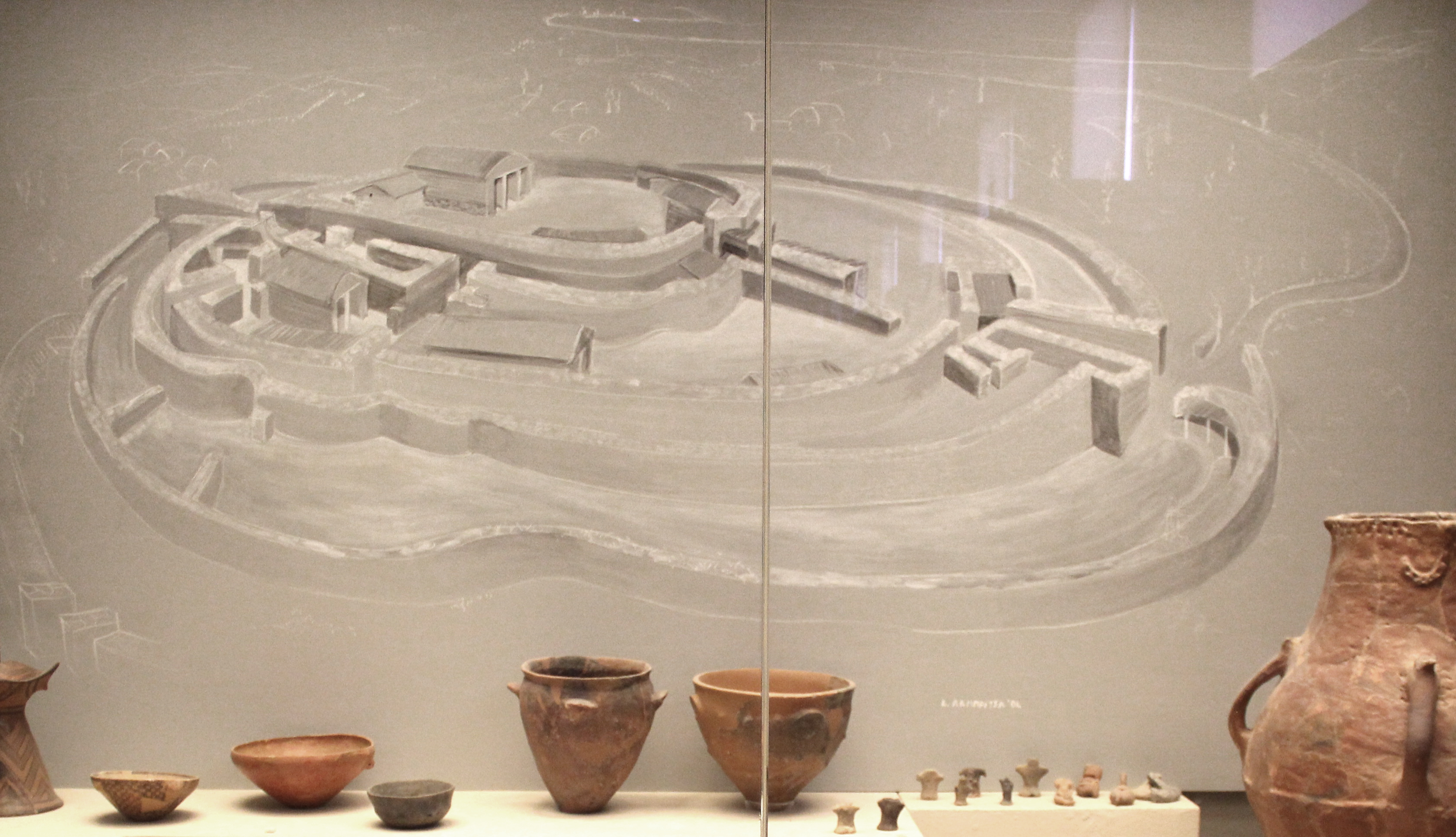
Dimini, walled acropolis, Greece, c. 4800 BC

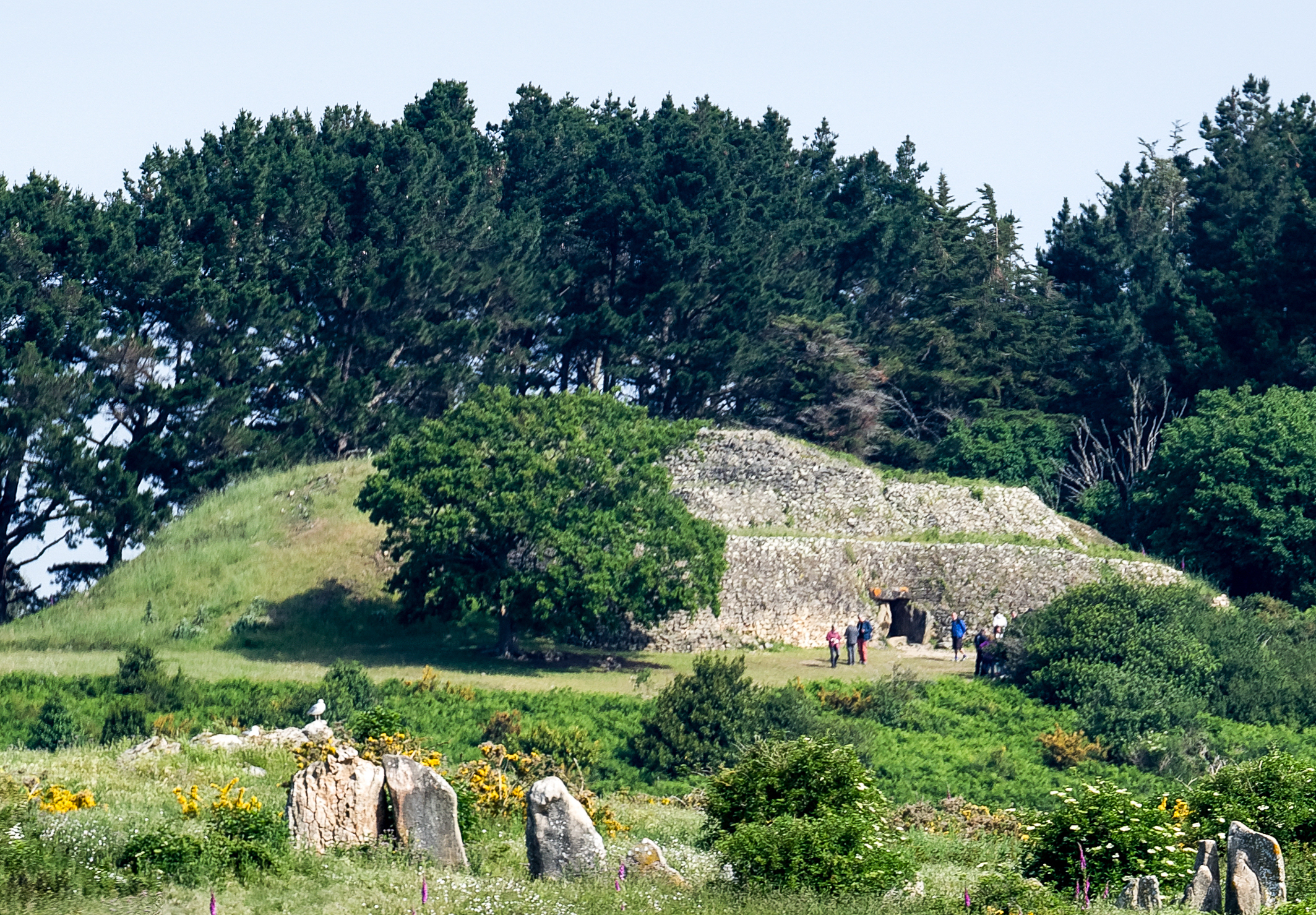
Gavrinis megalithic tomb, France, 4000 BC

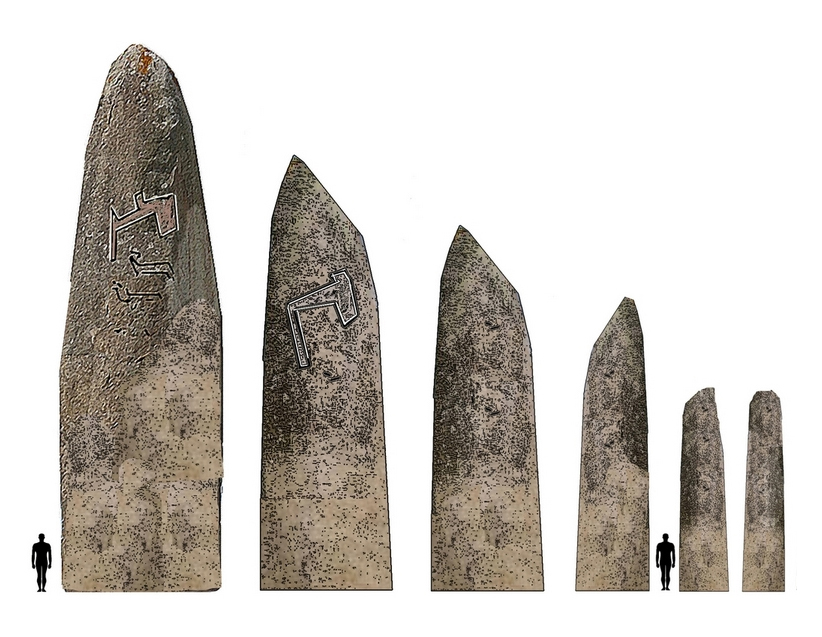
Locmariaquer megaliths, France, 4500 BC

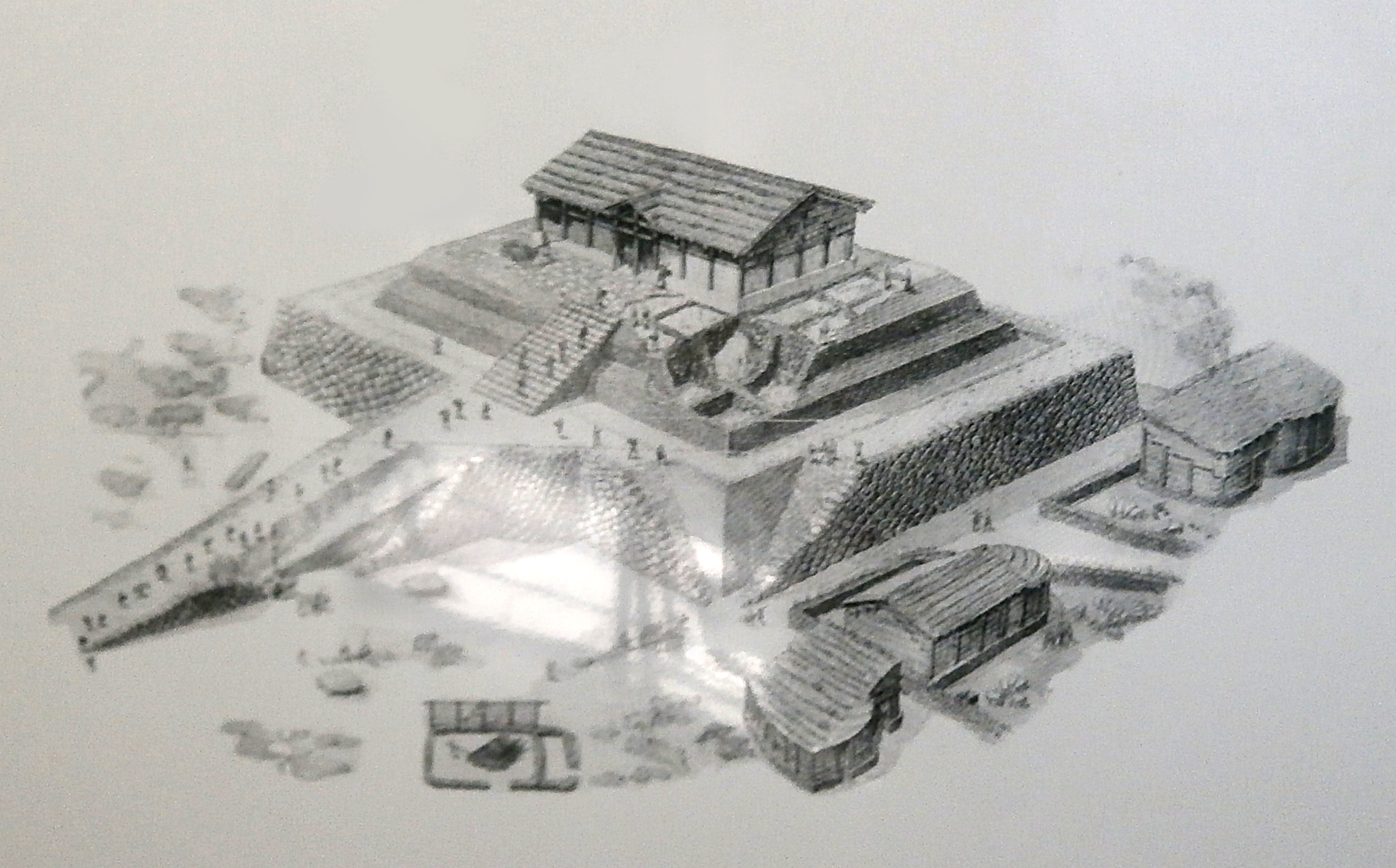
Monte d'Accoddi, Sardinia, c. 3500-3000 BC

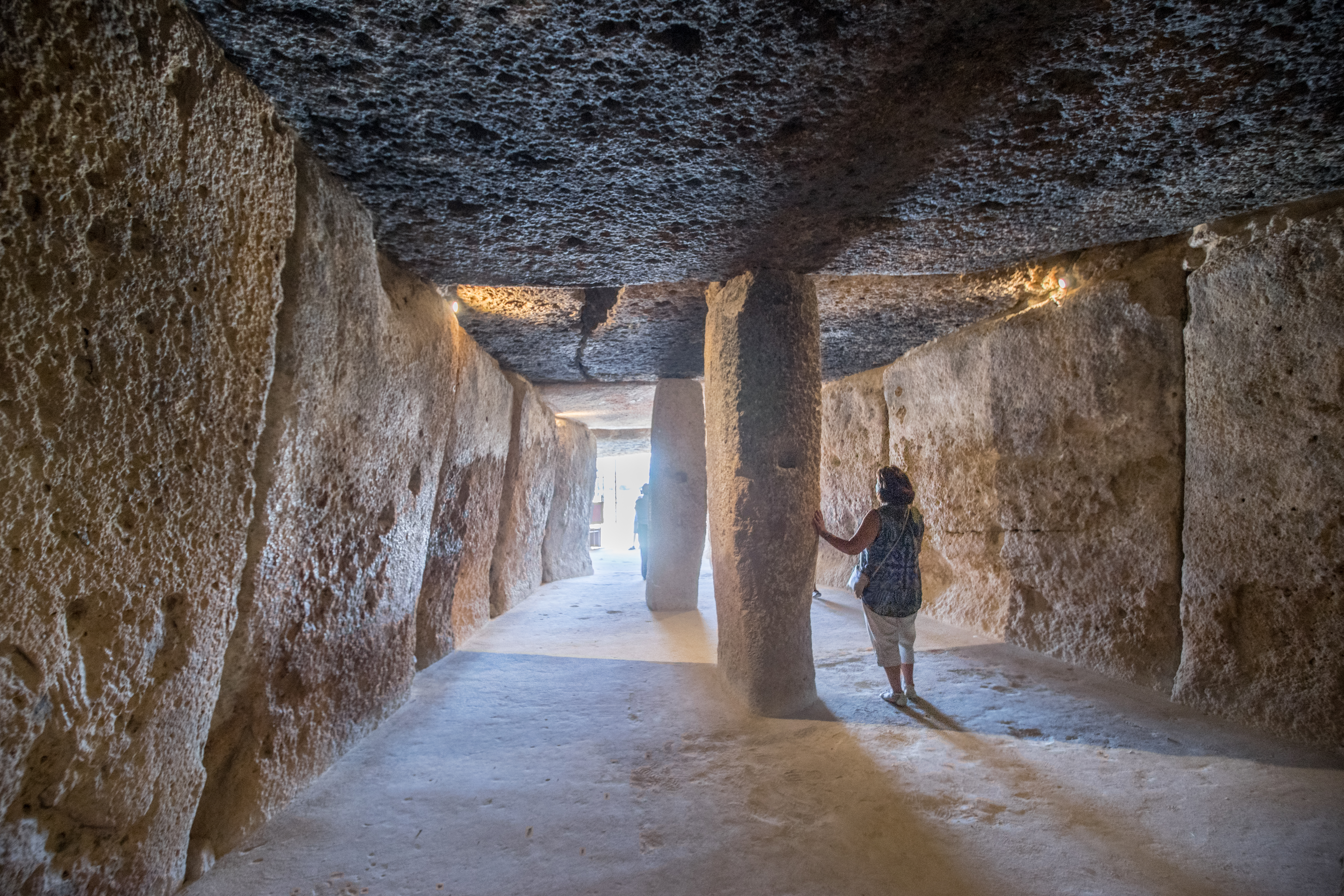
Menga Dolmen, Spain, c. 3700 BC

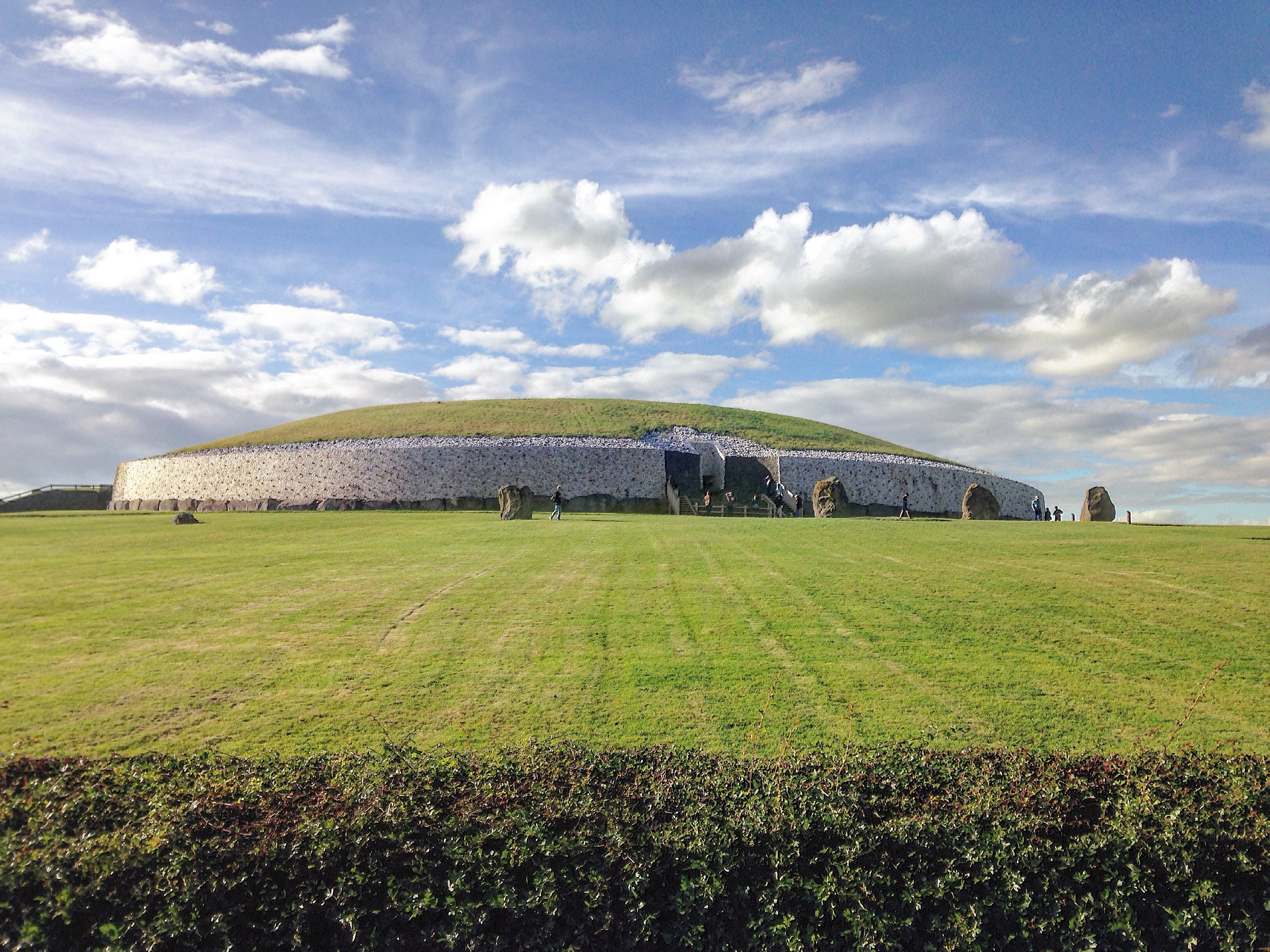
Newgrange, Ireland, 3200 BC

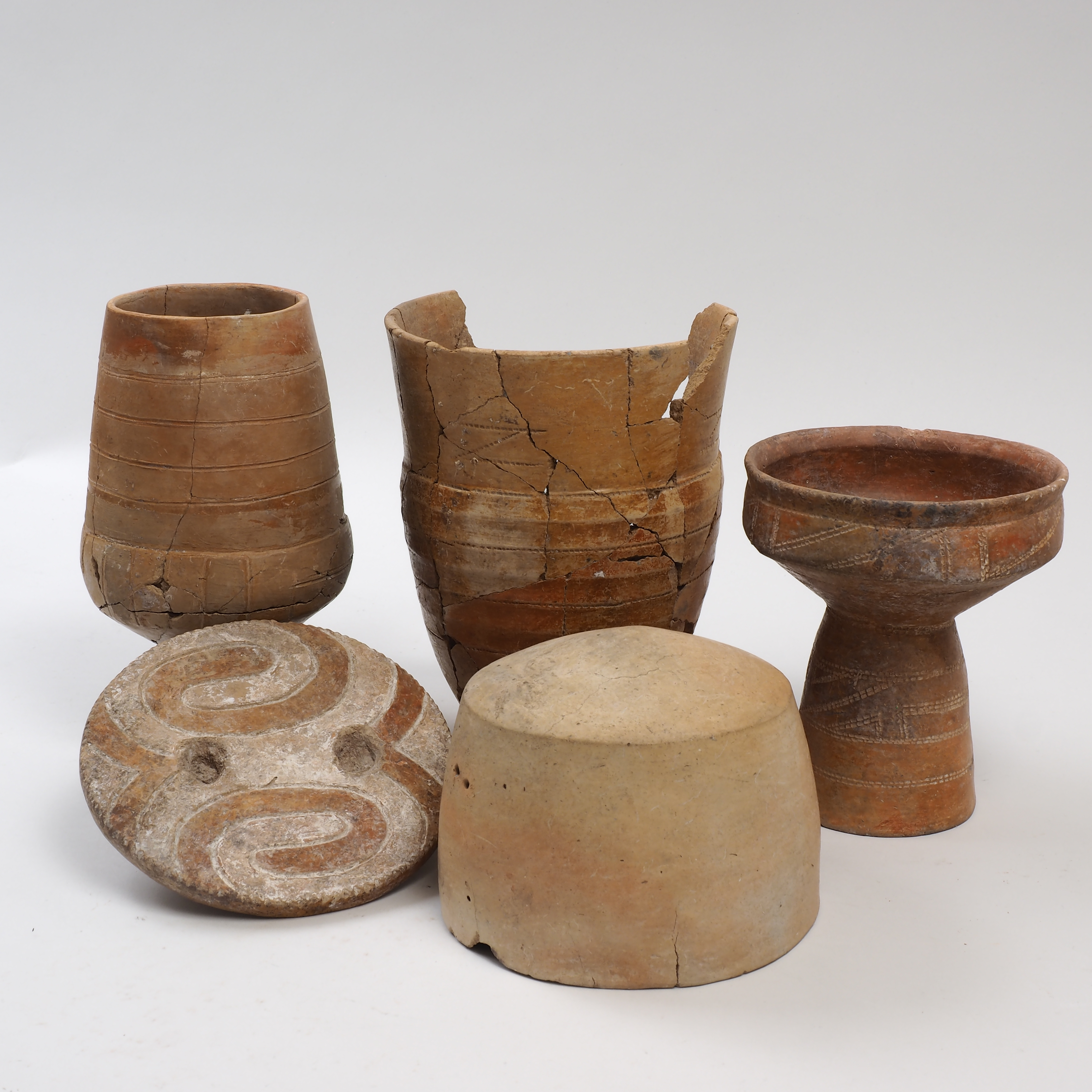
Hamangia culture, Bulgaria

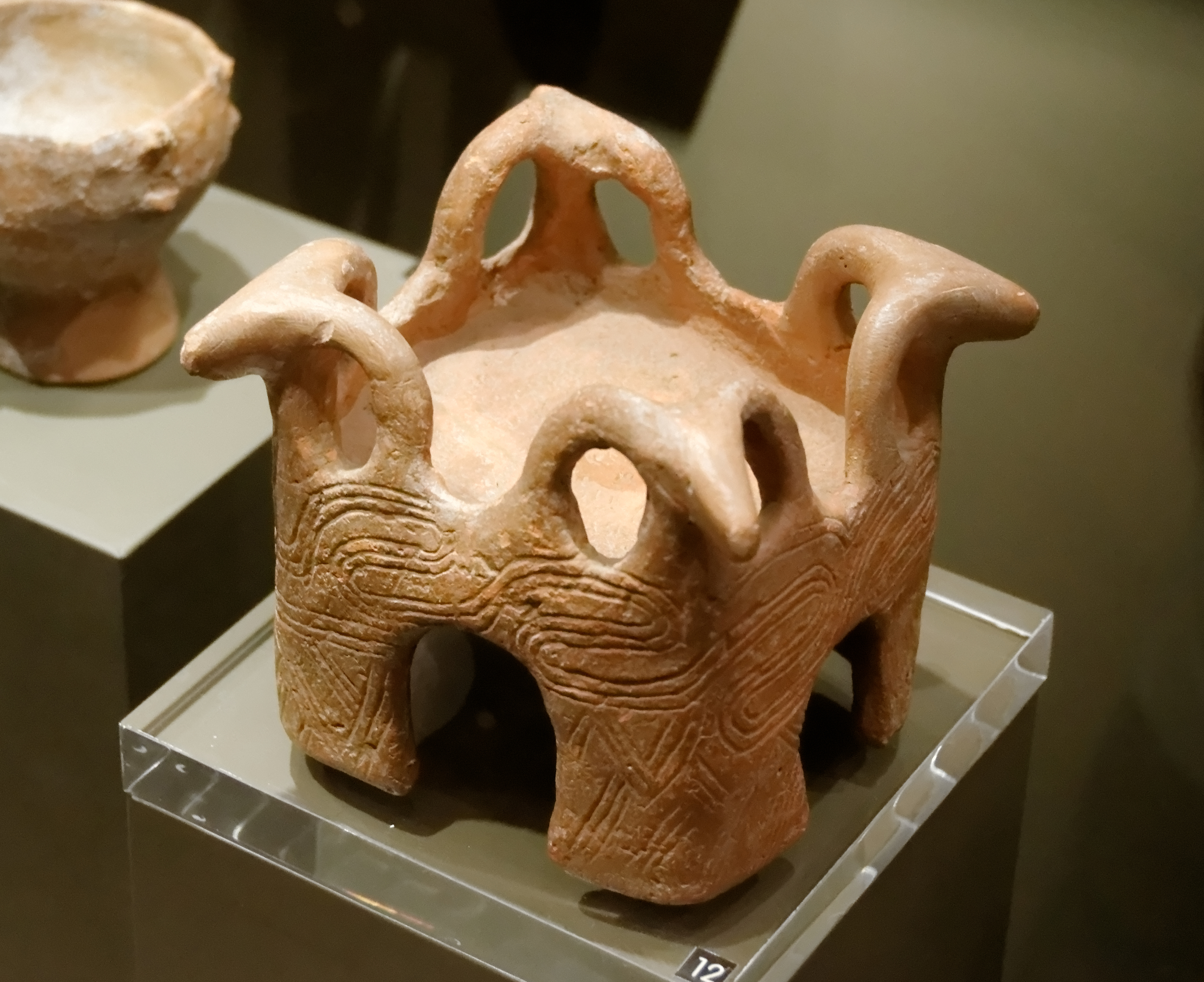
Tisza culture, Hungary, 5300 BC

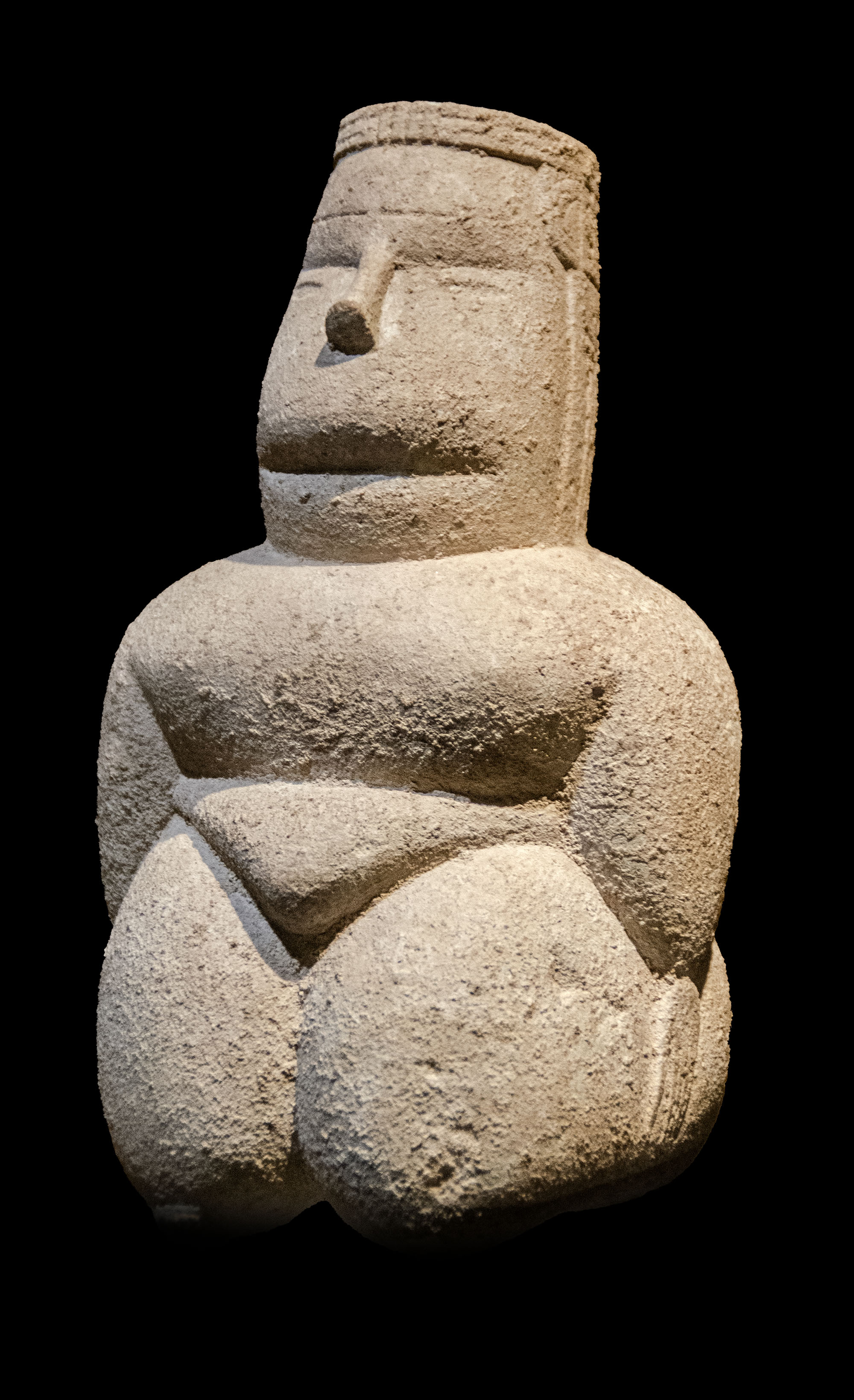
Bonu Ighinu culture, Sardinia, 4500 BC

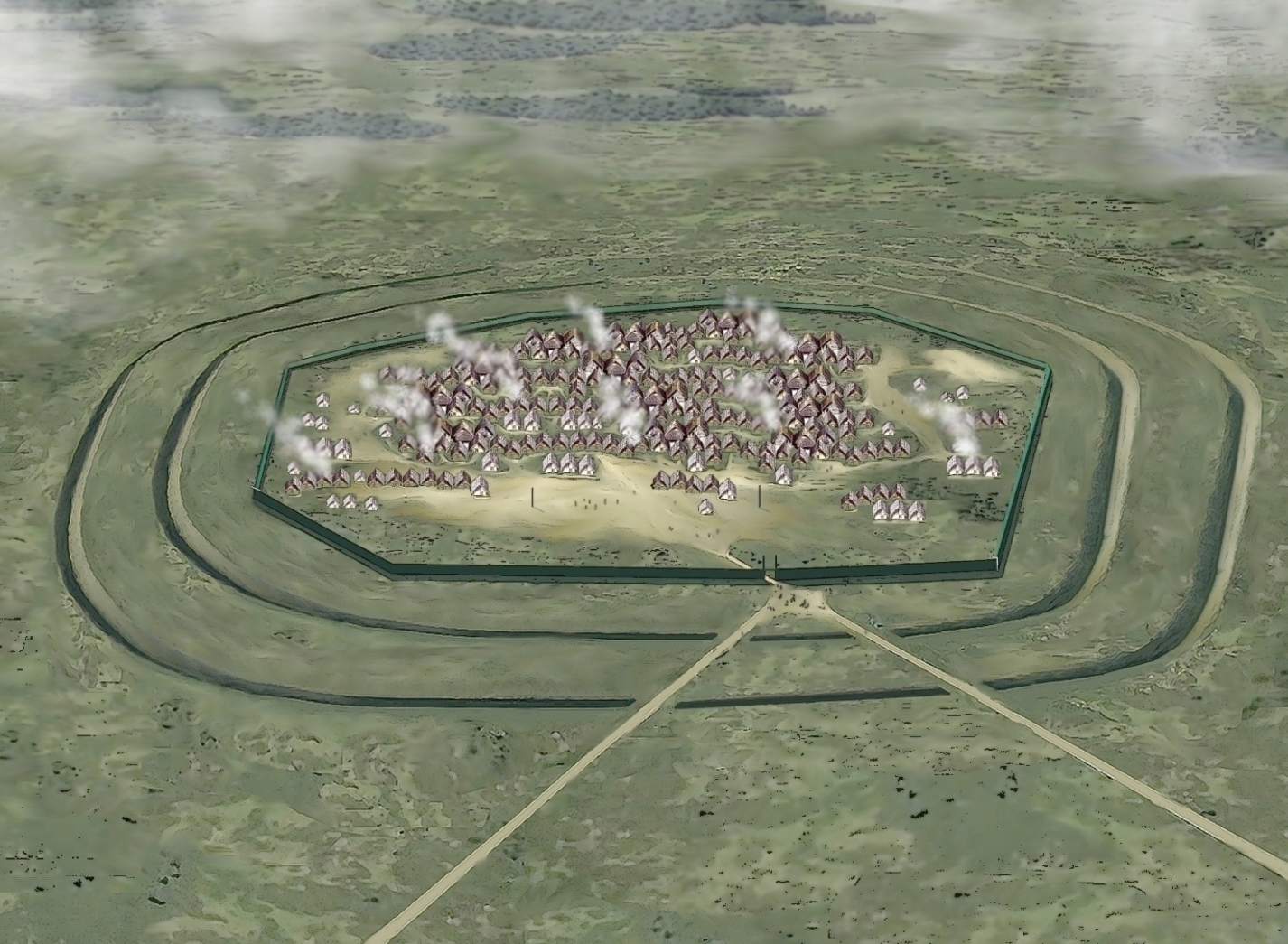
Okolište, Bosnia and Herzegovina, c. 5000 BC

== Chalcolithic (Copper Age) ==
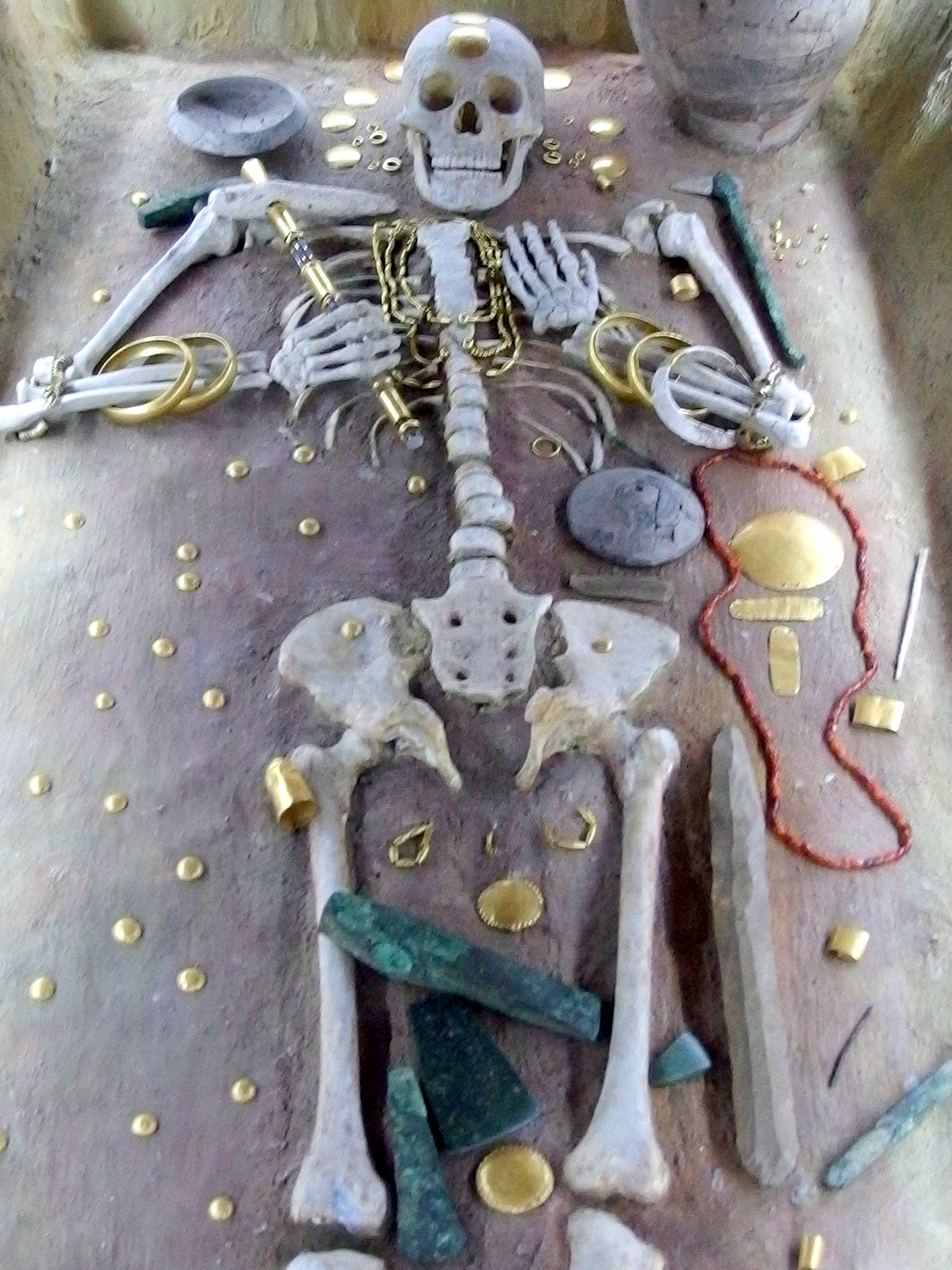
Varna culture elite burial, Bulgaria, 4500 BC

Also known as "Copper Age", the European Chalcolithic was a time of significant changes, the first of which was the invention of copper metallurgy. This is first attested in the Vinca culture in the 6th millennium BC. The Balkans became a major centre for copper extraction and metallurgical production in the 5th millennium BC. Copper artefacts were traded across the region, eventually reaching eastwards across the steppes of eastern Europe as far as the Khavalynsk culture. The 5th millennium BC also saw the appearance of economic stratification and the rise of ruling elites in the Balkan region, most notably in the Varna culture (c. 4500 BC) in Bulgaria, which developed the first known gold metallurgy in the world.

The economy of the Chalcolithic was no longer that of peasant communities and tribes, since some materials began to be produced in specific locations and distributed to wide regions. Mining of metal and stone was particularly developed in some areas, along with the processing of those materials into valuable goods.

Early Chalcolithic, 5500-4000 BC

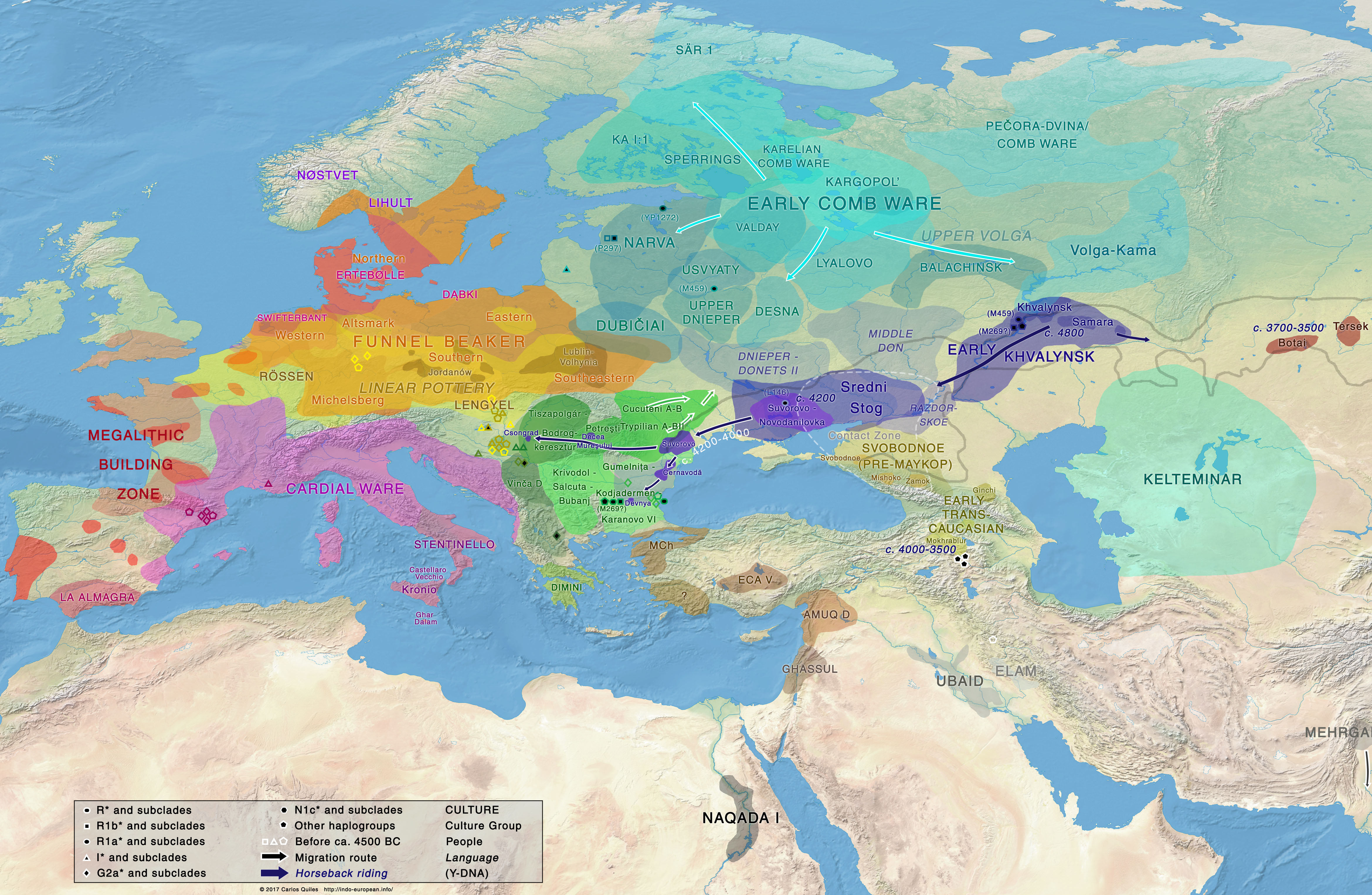
Prehistoric migrations c. 5000–4000 BC. Comb Ware, Khvalynsk, Dnieper–Donets and Sredny Stog cultures were found to have a significant EHG component.

From 5500 BC onwards, Eastern Europe was apparently infiltrated by people originating from beyond the Volga, creating a plural complex known as Sredny Stog culture, which substituted the previous Dnieper-Donets culture in Ukraine, pushing the natives to migrate northwest to the Baltic and to Denmark, where they mixed with the natives (TRBK A and C). The emergence of the Sredny Stog culture may be correlated with the expansion of Indo-European languages, according to the Kurgan hypothesis. Near the end of the period, around 4000 BC, another westward migration of supposed Indo-European speakers left many traces in the lower Danube area (culture of Cernavodă I) in what seems to have been an invasion.

Solnitsata ("The Saltworks"), a prehistoric town located in present-day Bulgaria, is believed by archaeologists to be the oldest town in Europe - a fortified stone settlement - citadelle, inner and outer city with pottery production site and the site of a salt production facility approximately six millennia ago; it flourished ca 4700–4200 BC.

Meanwhile, the Danubian Lengyel culture absorbed its northern neighbours in the Czech Republic and Poland for some centuries, only to recede in the second half of the period. The hierarchical model of the Varna culture seems to have been replicated later in the Tiszan region with the Bodrogkeresztur culture. Labour specialisation, economic stratification and possibly the risk of invasion may have been the reasons behind this development.

In the western Danubian region (the Rhine and Seine basins), the Michelsberg culture displaced its predecessor, the Rössen culture. Meanwhile, in the Mediterranean basin, several cultures (most notably the Chasséen culture in southeastern France and the Lagozza culture in northern Italy) converged into a functional union of which the most significant characteristic was the distribution network of honey-coloured silex. Despite the unity, the signs of conflicts are clear, as many skeletons show violent injuries. This was the time and area of Ötzi, the famous man found in the Alps.

Middle Chalcolithic, 4000-3000 BC

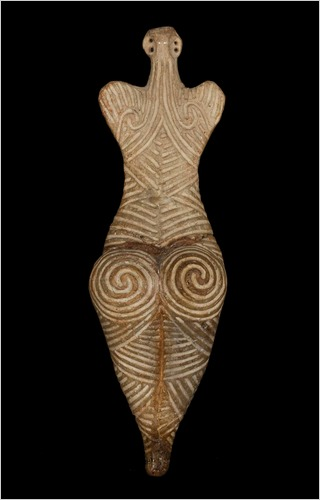
Cucuteni figurine, Romania, 4000 BC

This period extends through the first half of the 4th millennium BC. During this period the Cucuteni-Trypillia culture in Ukraine experienced a massive expansion, building the largest settlements in the world at the time, described as the first cities in the world by some scholars. The earliest known evidence for wheeled vehicles, in the form of wheeled models, also comes from Cucuteni-Trypillia sites, dated to c. 3900 BC.

In the Danubian region the powerful Baden culture emerged circa 3500 BC, extending more or less across the region of Austria-Hungary. The rest of the Balkans was profoundly restructured after the invasions of the previous period, with the Coțofeni culture in the central Balkans showing pronounced eastern (or presumably Indo-European) traits. The new Ezero culture in Bulgaria (3300 BC), shows the first evidence of pseudo-bronze (or arsenical bronze), as does the Baden culture and the Cycladic culture (in the Aegean) after 2800 BC.

In Eastern Europe, the Yamnaya culture took over southern Russia and Ukraine. In western Europe, the only sign of unity came from the Megalithic super-culture, which extended from southern Sweden to southern Spain, including large parts of southern Germany as well. However, the Mediterranean and Danubian groupings of the previous period appear to have fragmented into many smaller pieces, some of them apparently backward in technological matters. From 2800 BC, the Danubian Seine-Oise-Marne culture pushed directly or indirectly southwards and destroyed most of the rich Megalithic culture of western France. After 2600 BC, several phenomena prefigured the changes of the upcoming period:

Large towns with stone walls appeared in two different areas of the Iberian Peninsula: one in the Portuguese region of Estremadura (culture of Vila Nova de Sao Pedro), strongly embedded in the Atlantic Megalithic culture; the other near Almería (southeastern Spain), centred around the large town of Los Millares, of Mediterranean character, probably affected by eastern cultural influxes (tholoi). Despite the many differences, both civilisations seem to have had friendly contact and to have maintained productive exchanges. In the area of Dordogne (Aquitaine, France), a new unexpected culture of bowmen appears: the Artenac culture soon takes control of western and even northern France and Belgium. In Poland and nearby regions, the putative Indo-Europeans reorganised and reconsolidated with the culture of the Globular Amphoras. Nevertheless, the influence of many centuries in direct contact with the still-powerful Danubian peoples had greatly modified their culture.

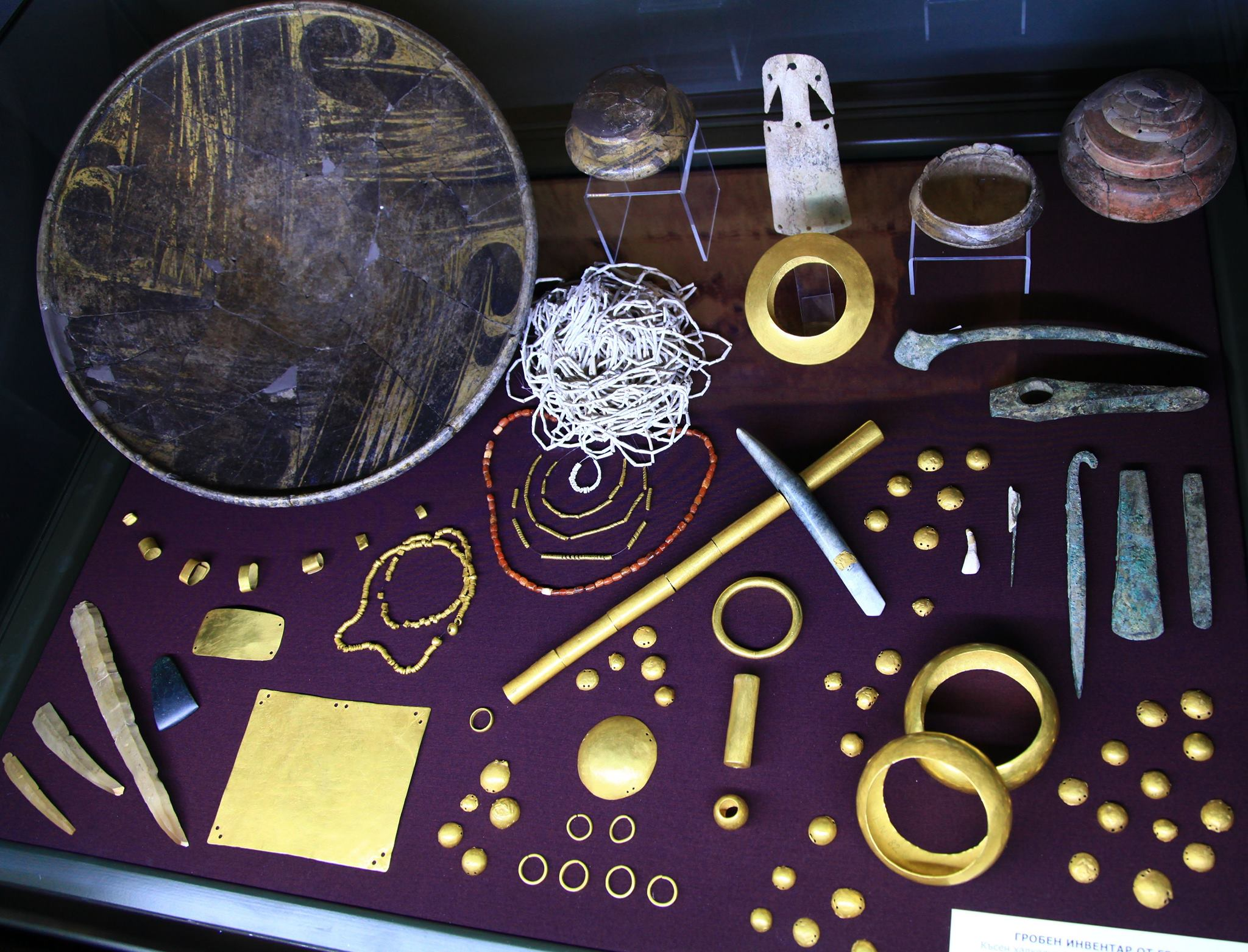
Varna culture, Bulgaria, 4500 BC

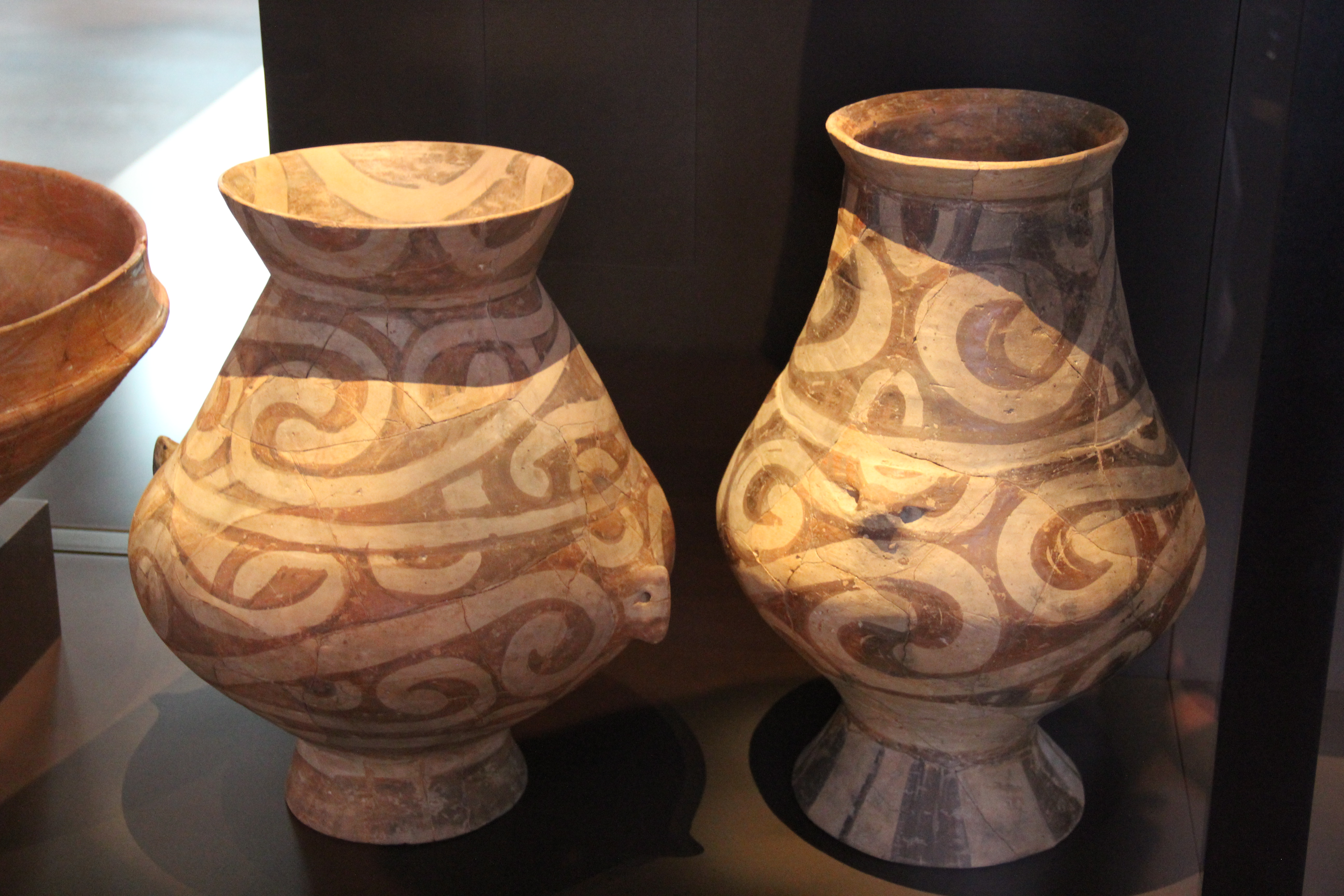
Cucuteni-Trypillia pottery, Ukraine

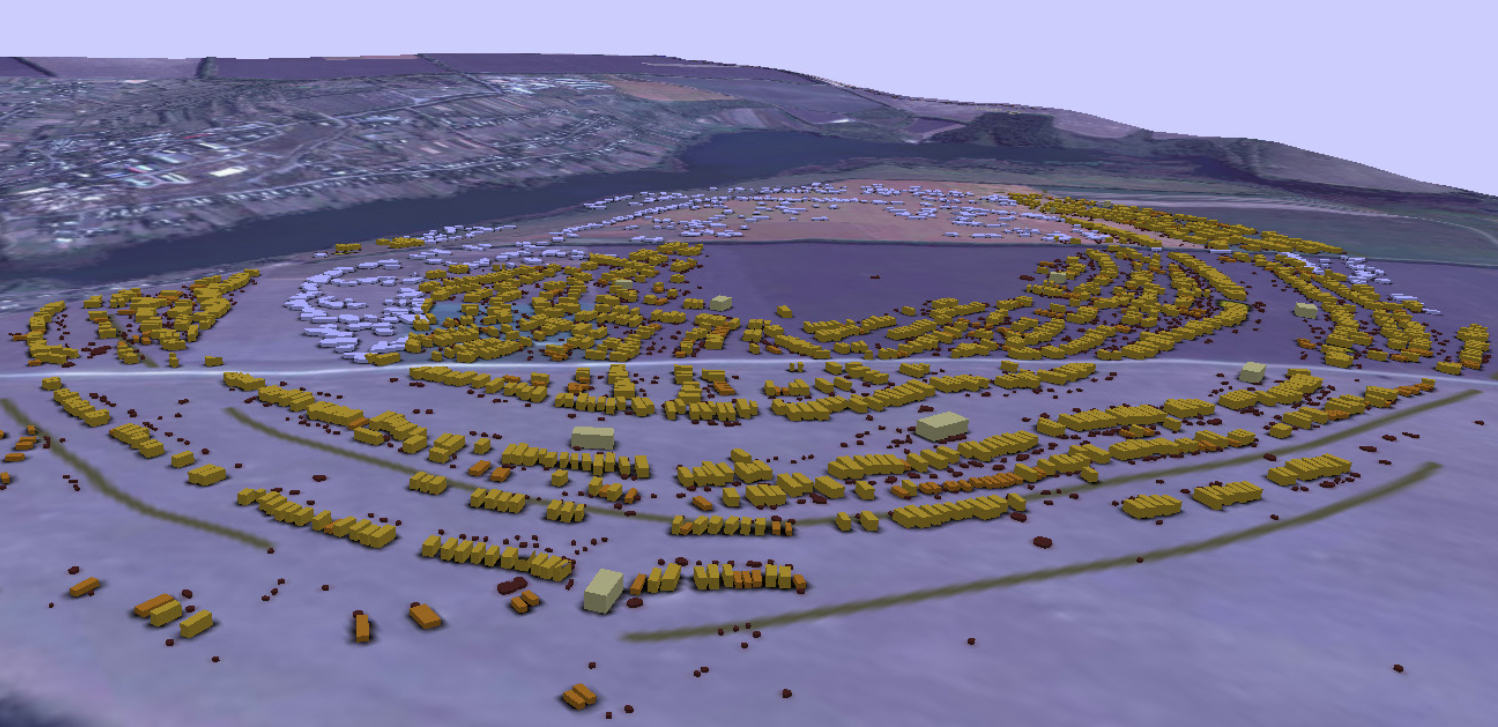
Maidanetske, Ukraine, c. 3800 BC

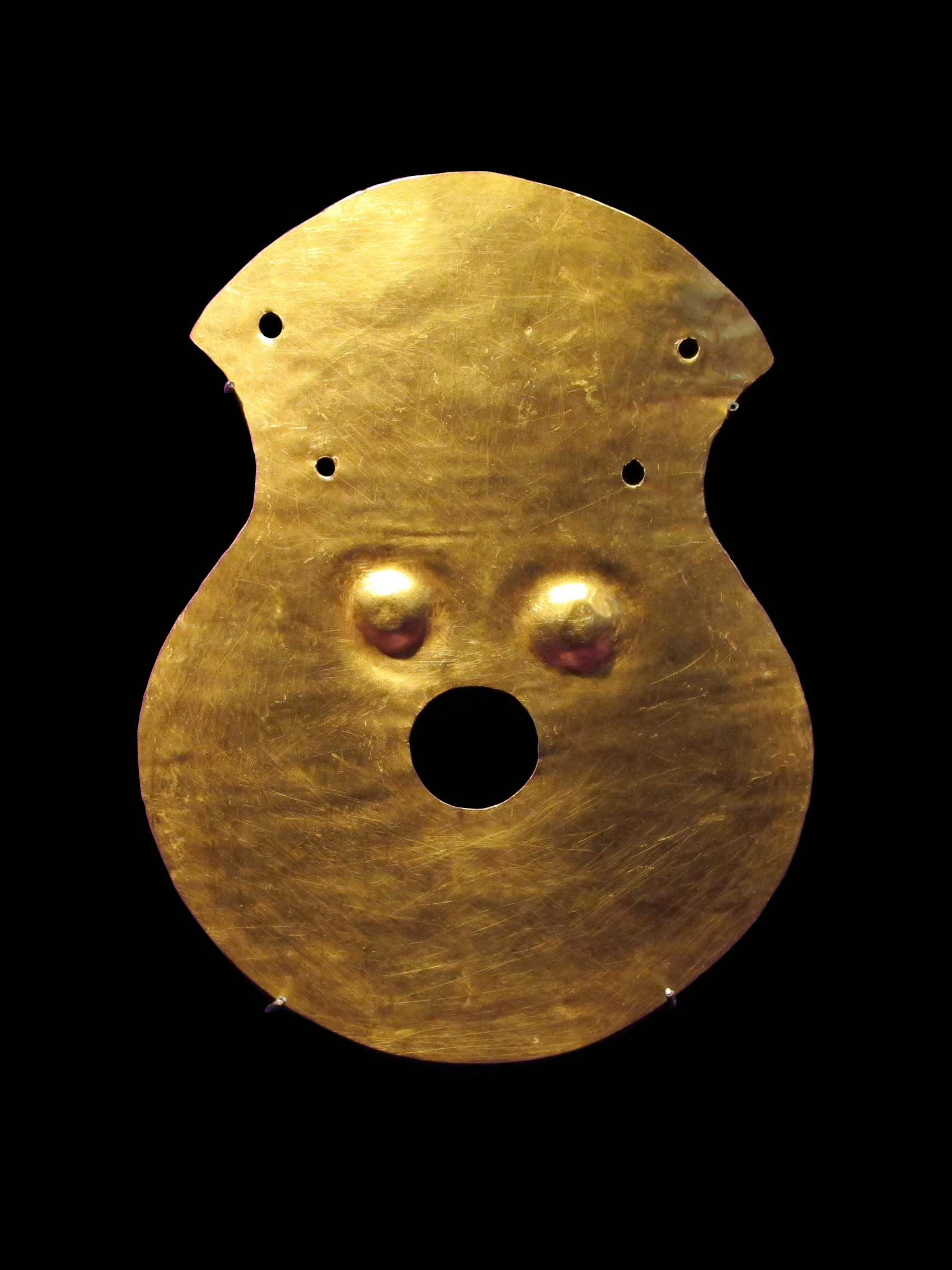
Bodrogkeresztúr culture, Hungary, 4000-3600 BC

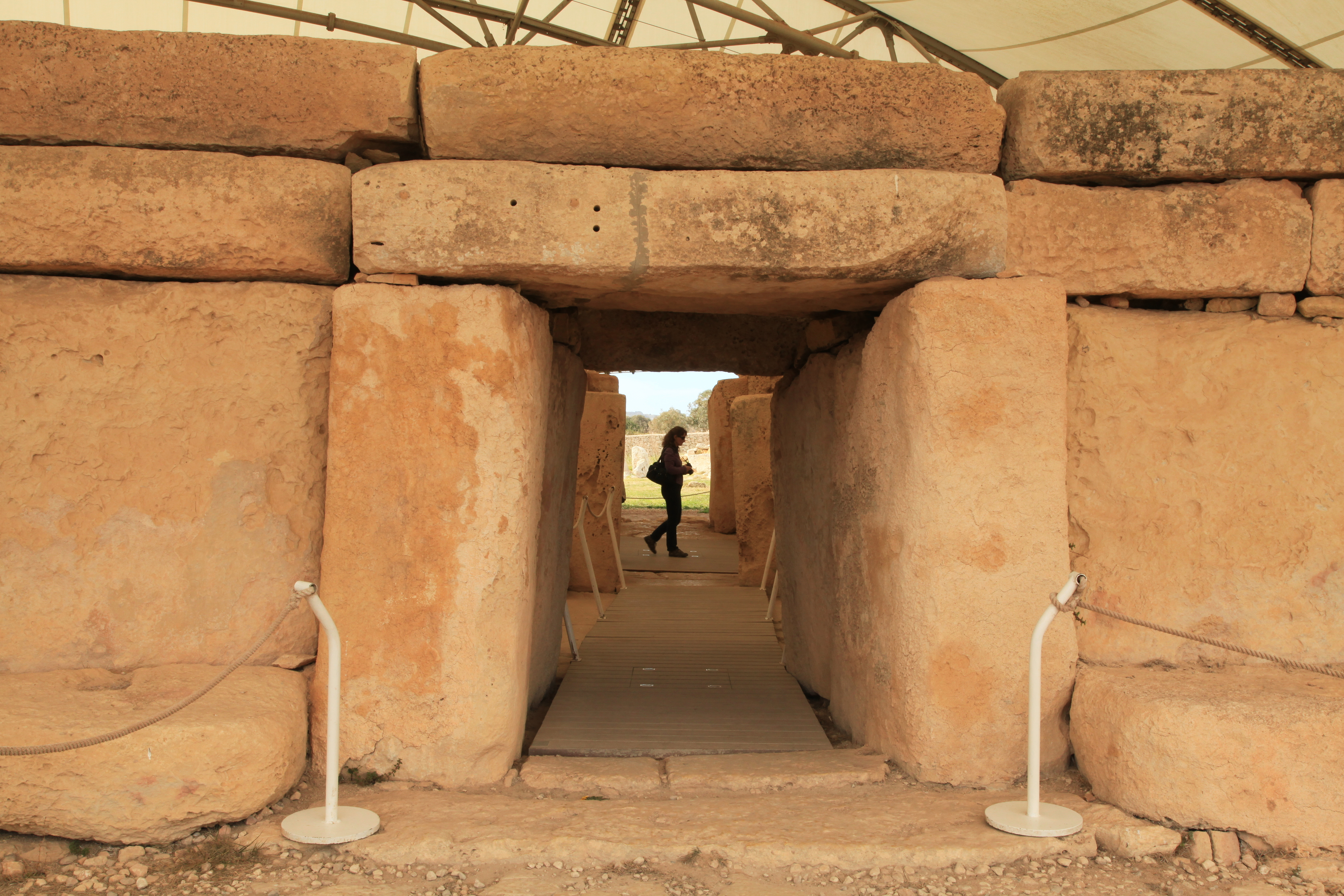
Ħaġar Qim temple, Malta, 3600-3200 BC

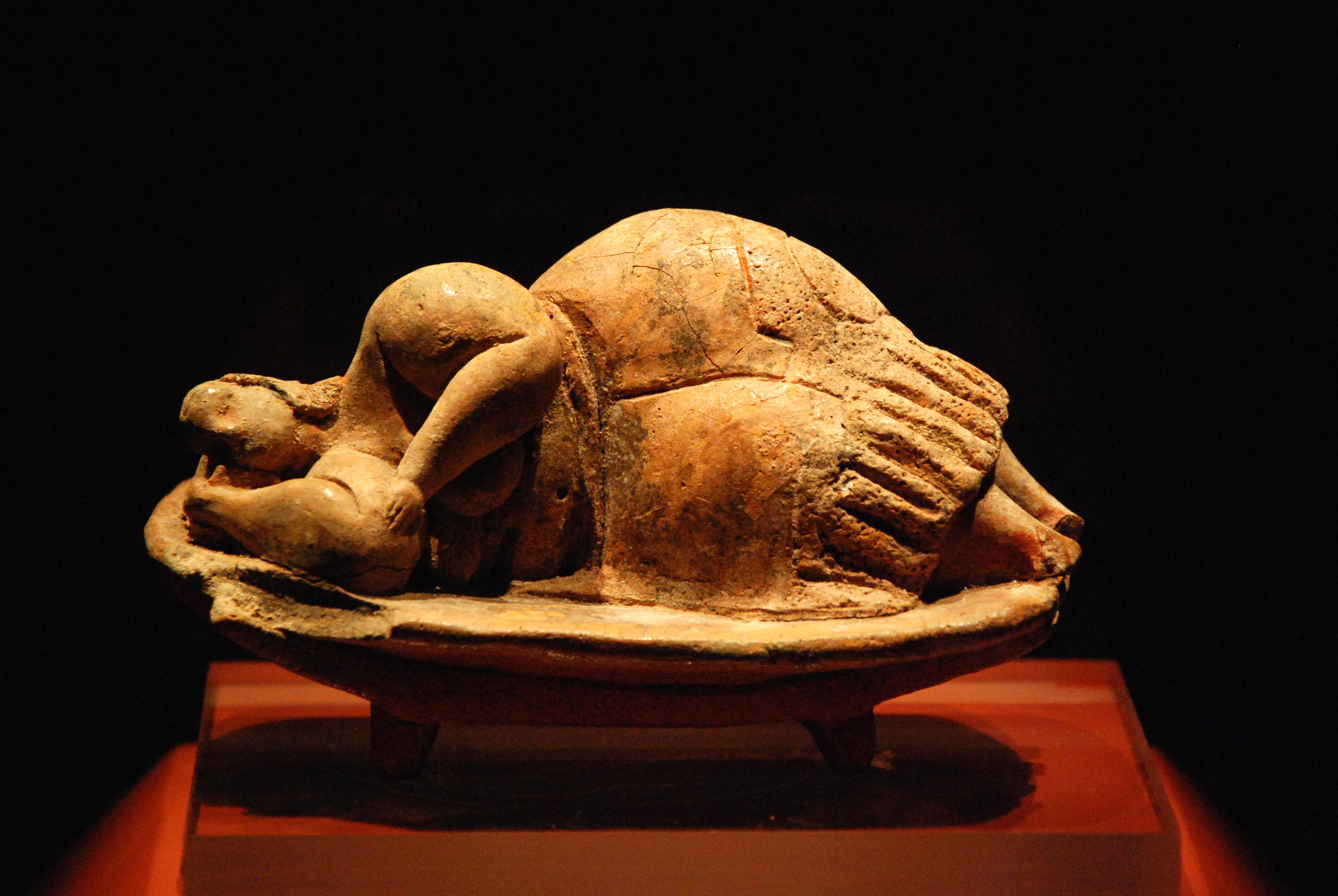
Ħal Saflieni figurine, Malta, 3300–3000 BC

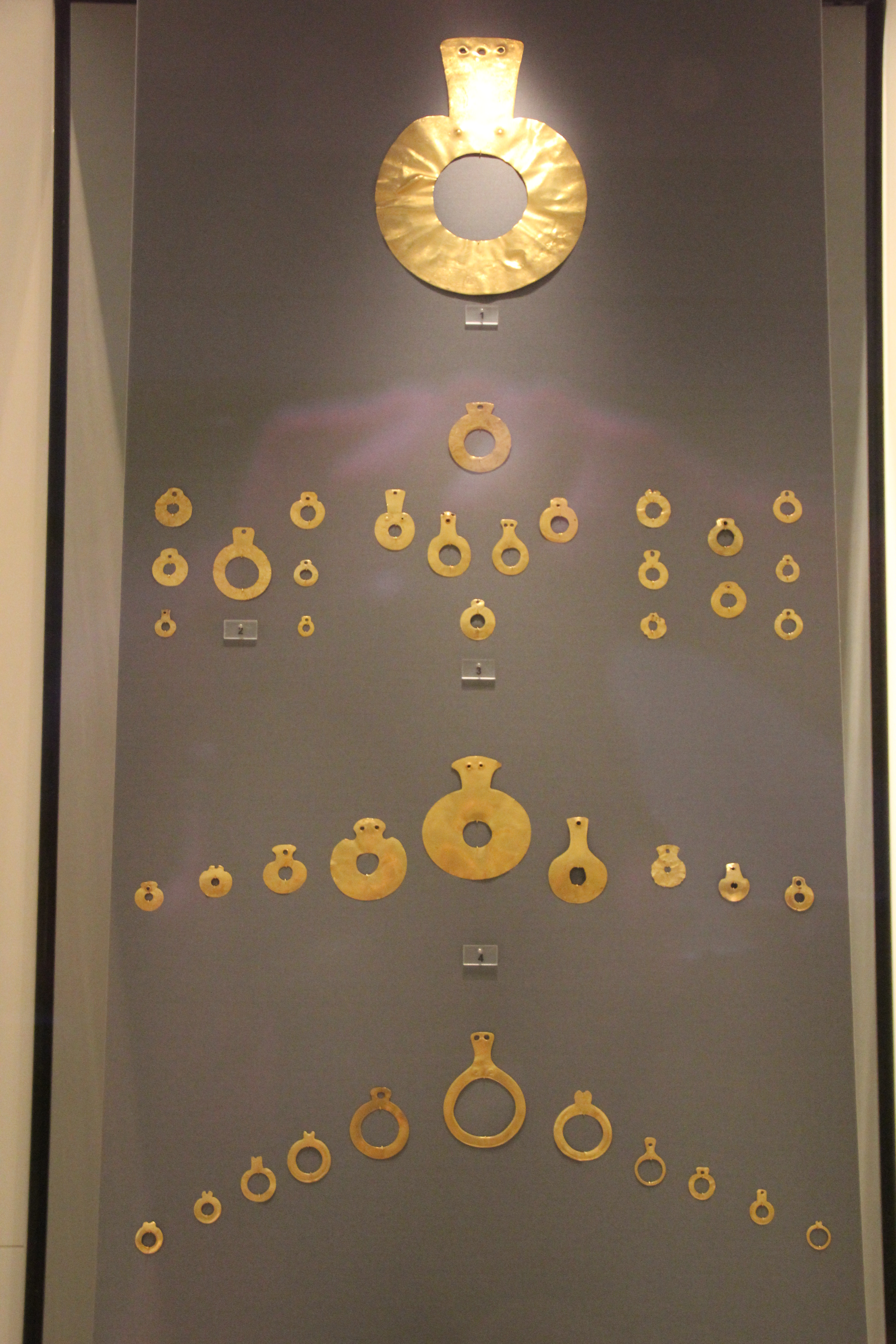
Dimini culture, Greece, c. 4000 BC

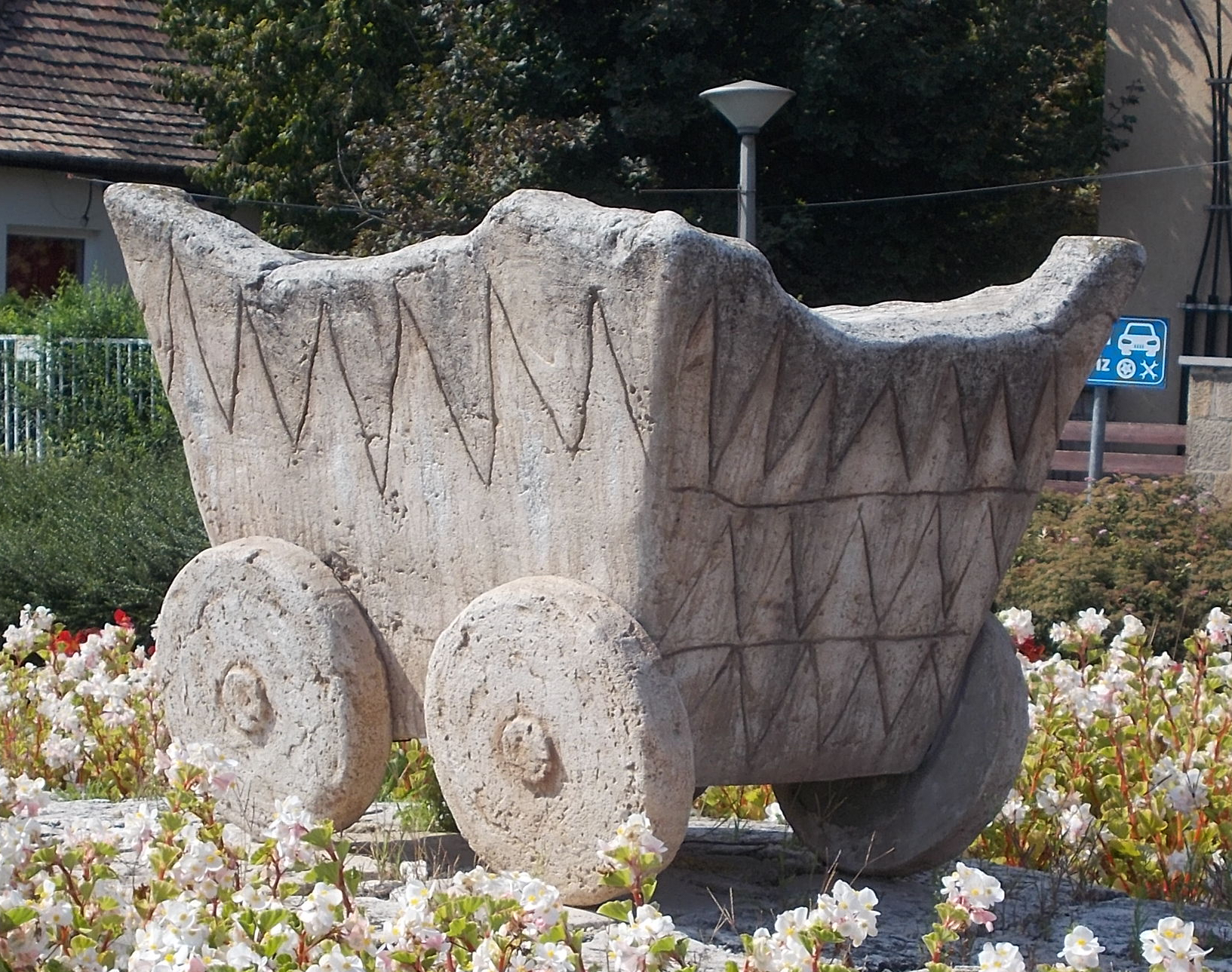
Baden culture, Hungary, 3300 BC

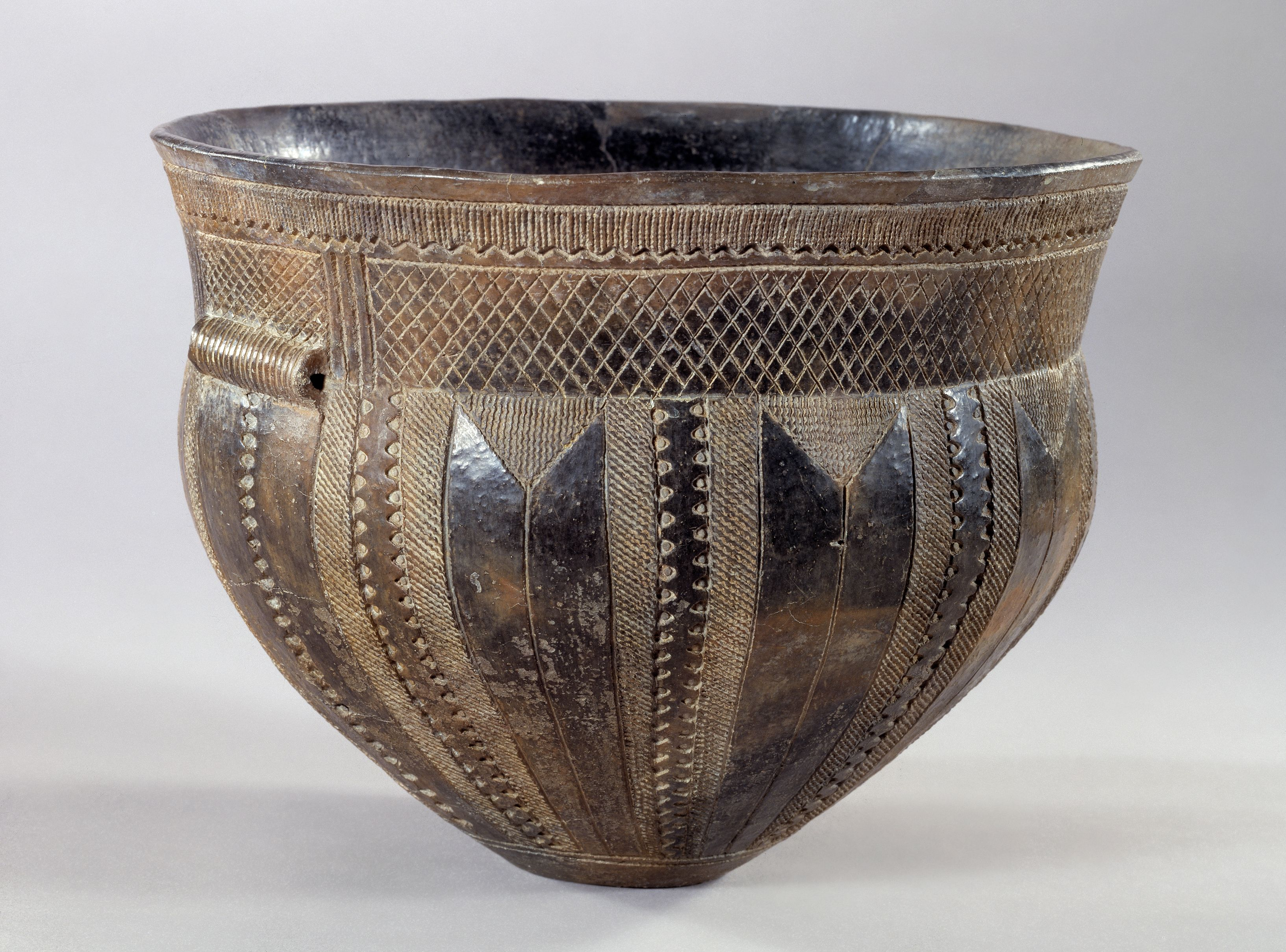
Funnelbeaker culture, Denmark, 3200 BC

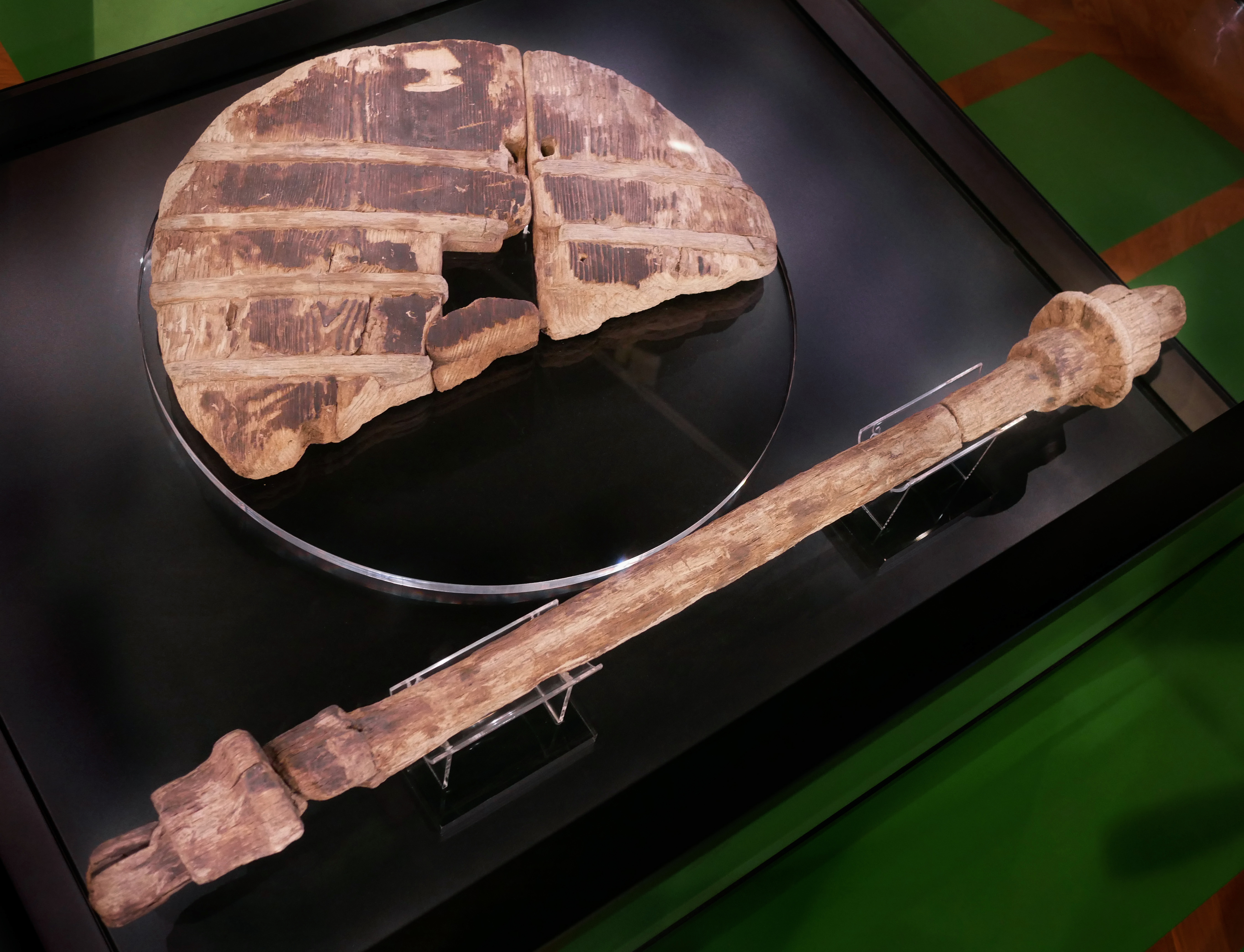
Ljubljana Wheel, Slovenia, 3150 BC

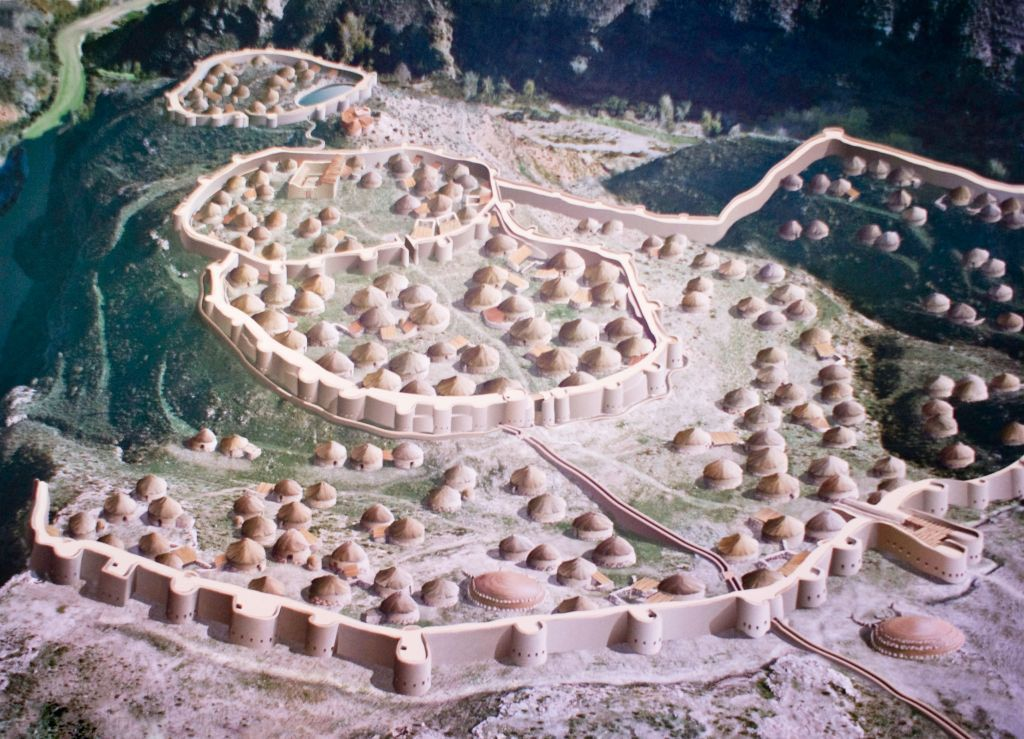
Los Millares, Spain, c. 3100 BC

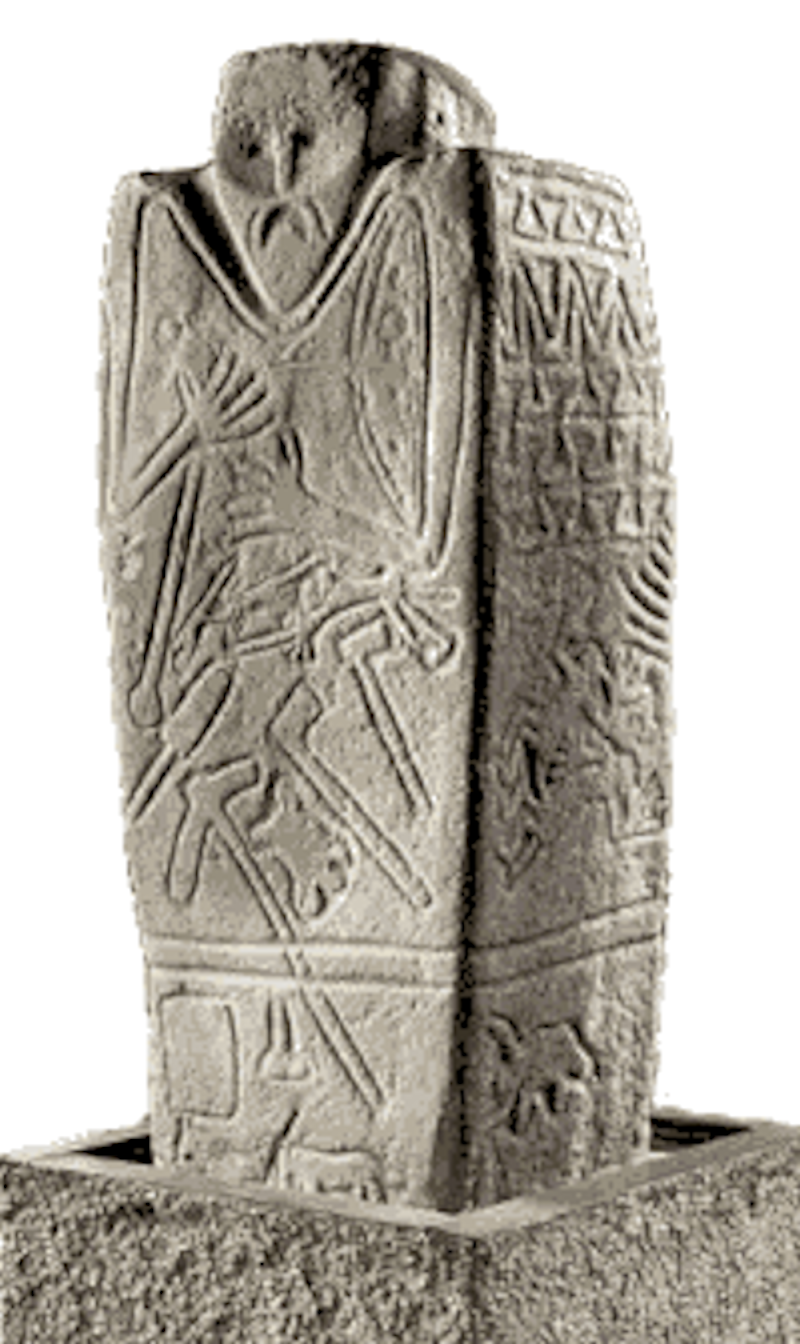
Yamnaya stone stele, Ukraine, c. 2600 BC

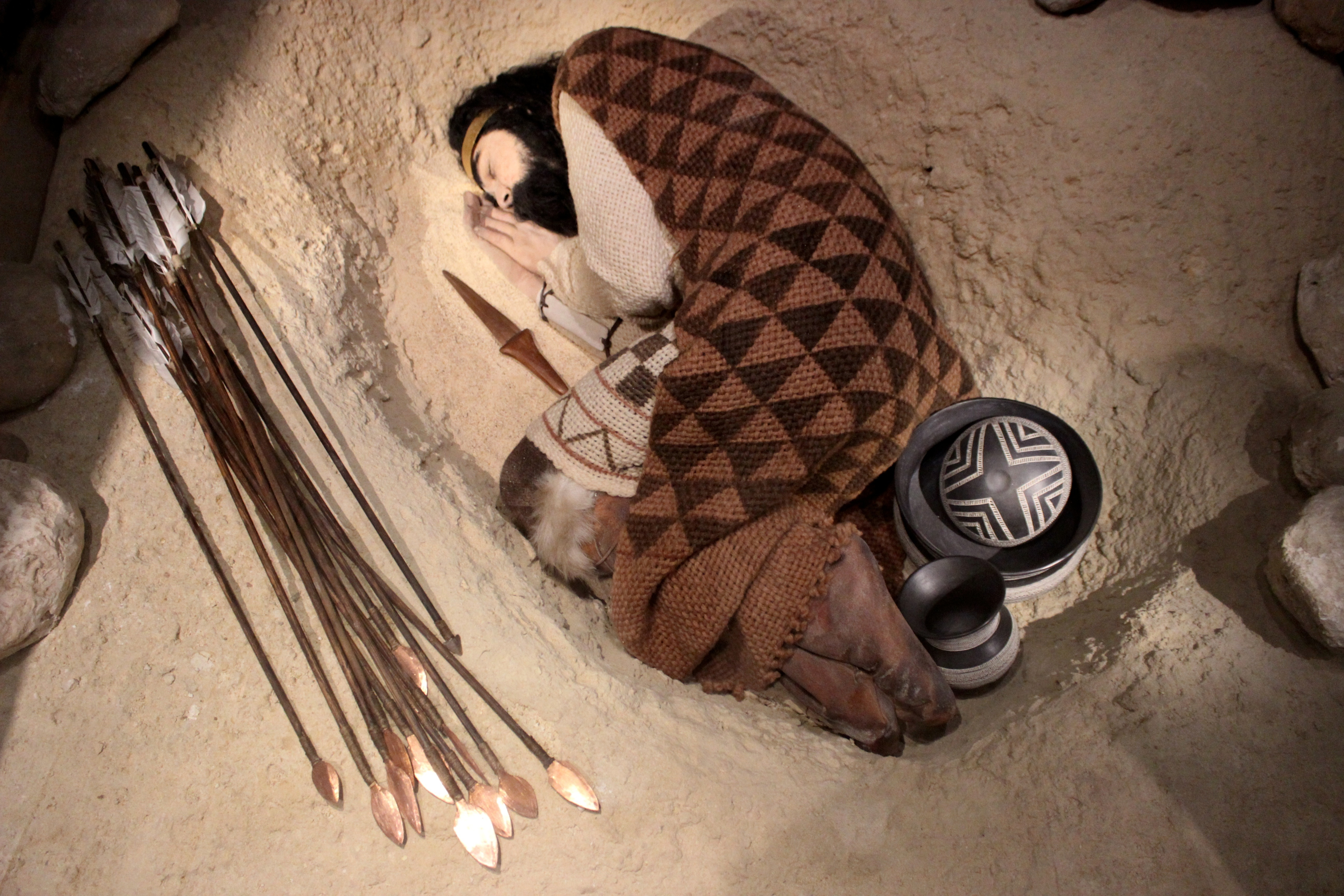
Bell Beaker culture burial, Spain, c. 2500 BC

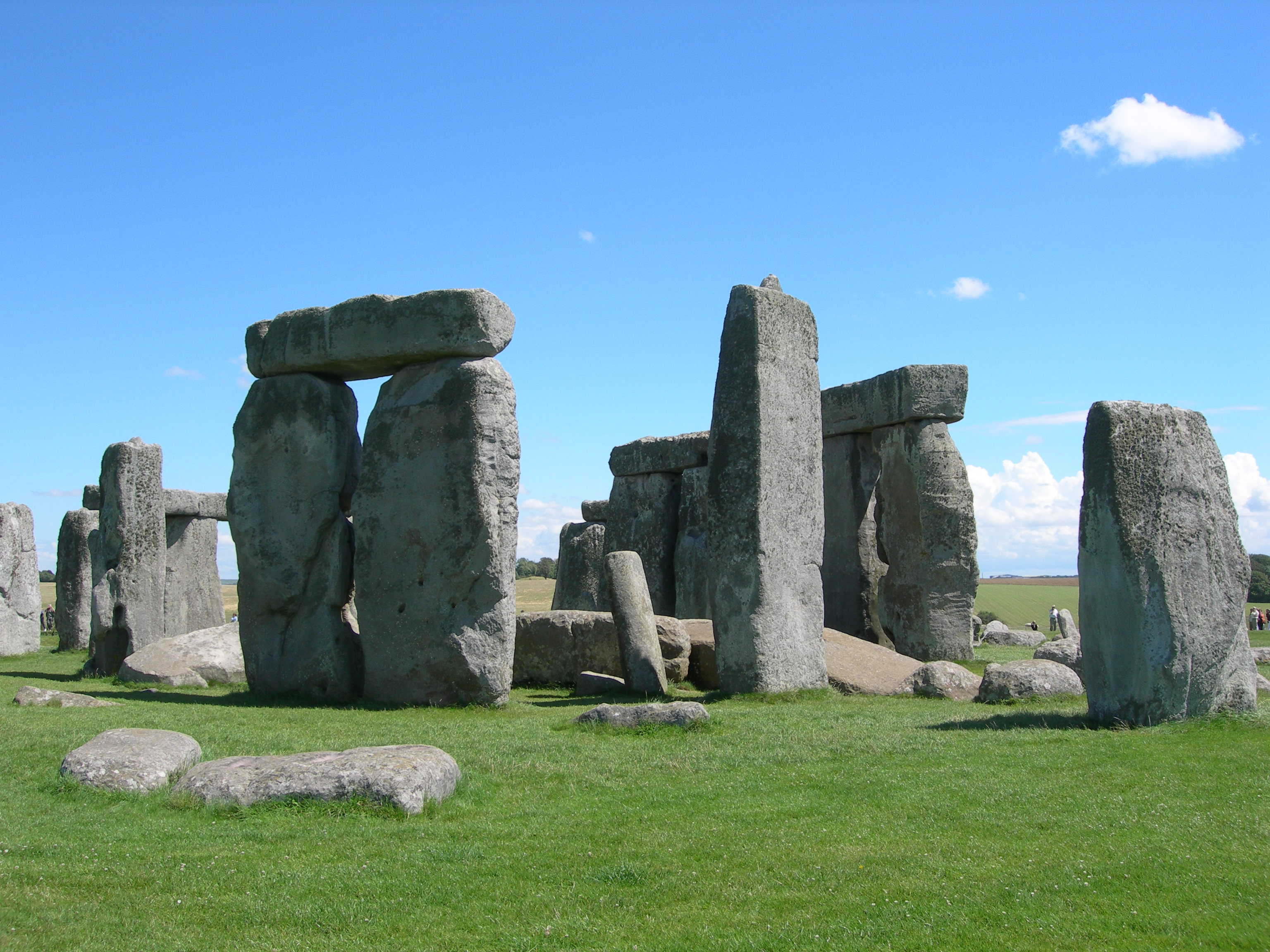
Stonehenge, Britain, 2500 BC

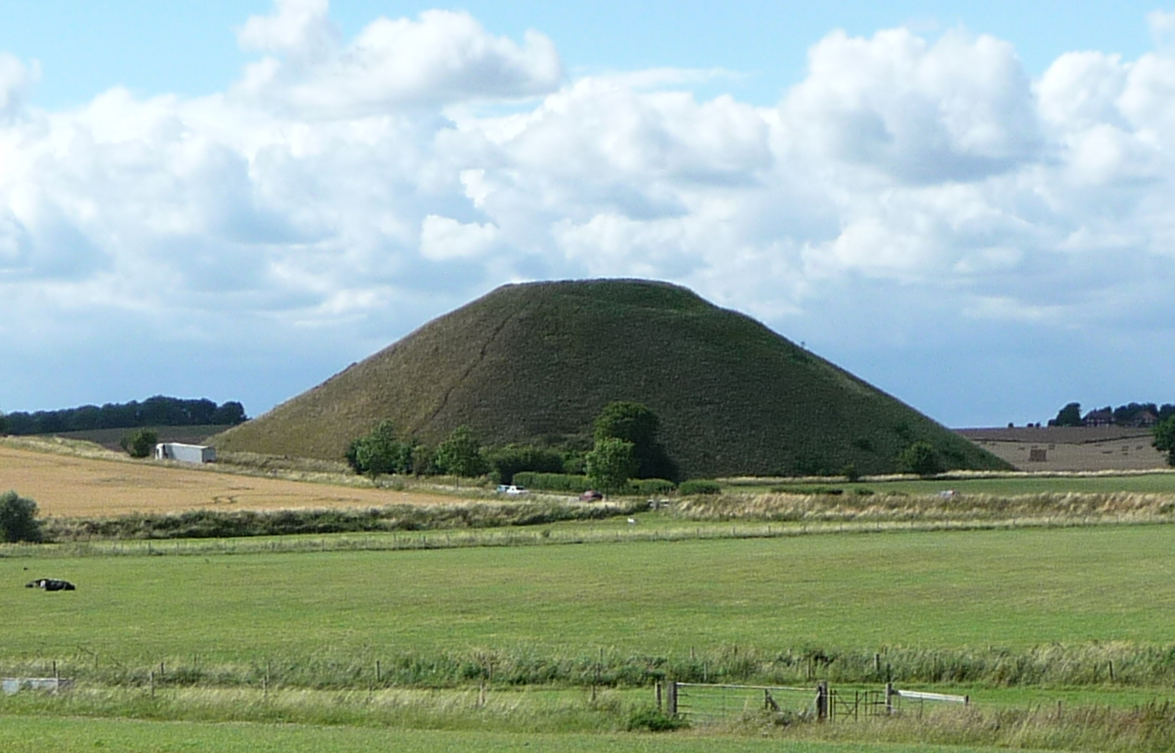
Silbury Hill, Britain, c. 2400 BC

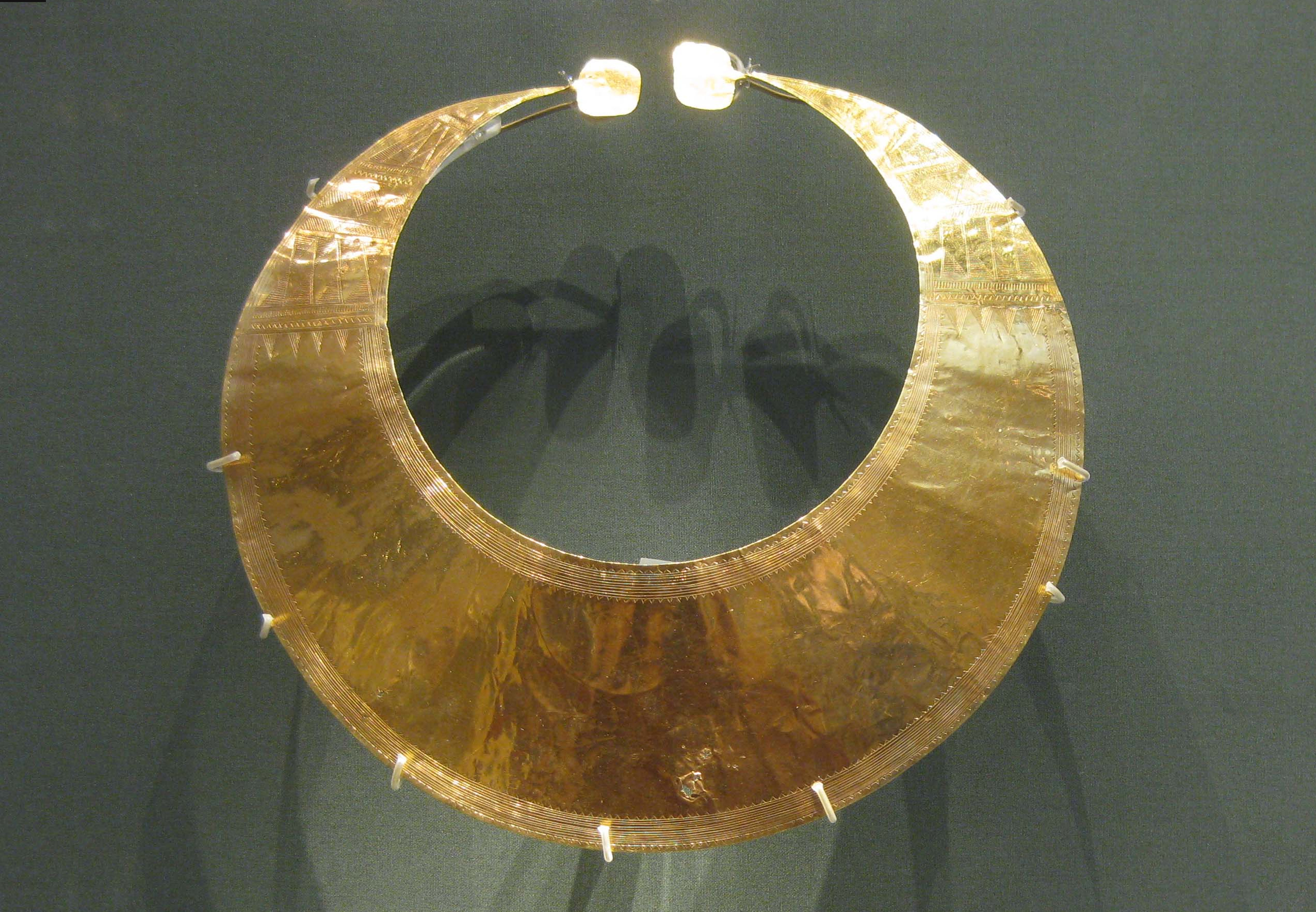
Gold lunula, Ireland, c. 2400 BC

== Bronze Age ==
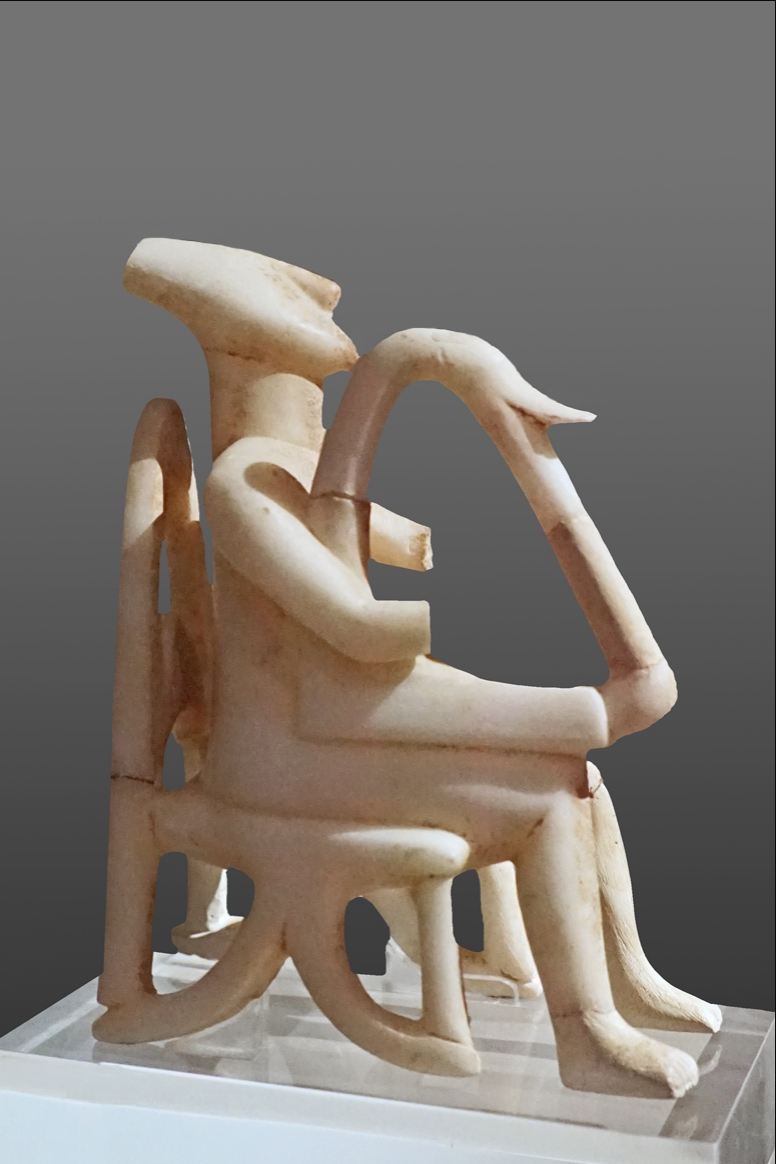
Cycladic culture marble figurine, 2700 BC

Use of Bronze begins in the Aegean around 3200 BC. From 2500 BC the new Catacomb culture, whose origins were obscure but were also Indo-Europeans, displaced the Yamna peoples in the regions north and east of the Black Sea, confining them to their original area east of the Volga. Around 2400 BC, the Corded Ware culture replaced their predecessors and expanded to Danubian and Nordic areas of western Germany. One related branch invaded Denmark and southern Sweden (Scandinavian Single Grave culture), and the mid-Danubian basin, though showing more continuity, had clear traits of new Indo-European elites (Vučedol culture). Simultaneously, in the West, the Artenac peoples reached Belgium. With the partial exception of Vučedol, the Danubian cultures, which had been so buoyant just a few centuries ago, were wiped off the map of Europe. The rest of the period was the story of a mysterious phenomenon: the Beaker people, which seemed to be of a mercantile character and to have preferred being buried according to a very specific, almost invariable, ritual. Nevertheless, out of their original area of western Central Europe, they appeared only within local cultures and so they never invaded and assimilated but went to live among those peoples and kept their way of life, which is why they are believed to be merchants.

The rest of Europe remained mostly unchanged and apparently peaceful. In 2300 BC, the first Beaker Pottery appeared in Bohemia and expanded in many directions but particularly westward, along the Rhone and the seas, reaching the culture of Vila Nova (Portugal) and Catalonia (Spain) as their limits. Simultaneously but unrelatedly, in 2200 BC in the Aegean region, the Cycladic culture decayed and was substituted by the new palatine phase of the Minoan culture of Crete.

The second phase of Beaker Pottery, from 2100 BC onwards, is marked by the displacement of the centre of the phenomenon to Portugal, within the culture of Vila Nova. The new centre's influence reached to all of southern and western France but was absent in southern and western Iberia, with the notable exception of Los Millares. After 1900 BC, the centre of the Beaker Pottery returned to Bohemia, and in Iberia, a decentralisation of the phenomenon occurred, with centres in Portugal but also in Los Millares and Ciempozuelos.

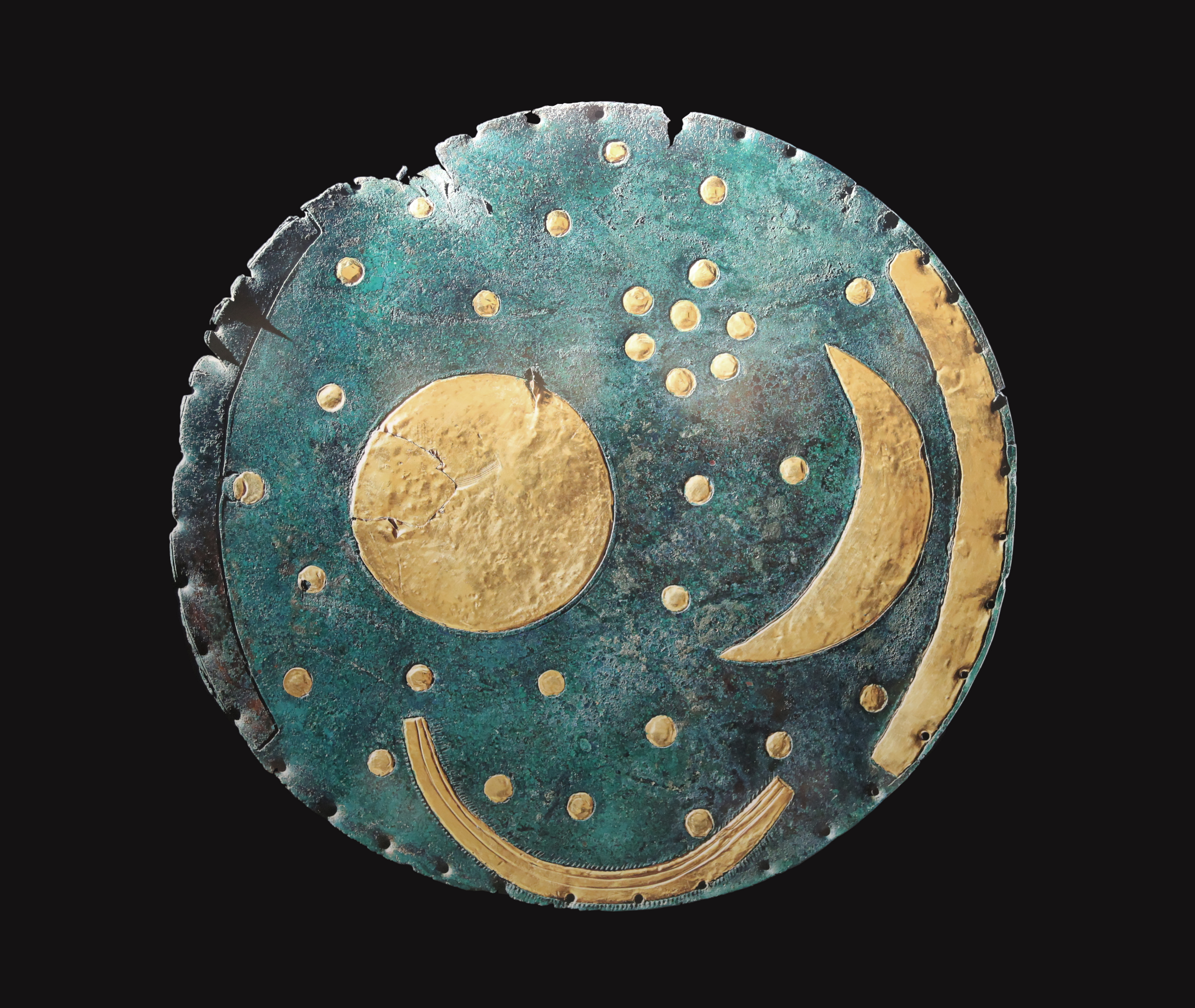
Nebra sky disk, Germany, 1800 BC

Though the use of bronze started much earlier in the Aegean area (c. 3.200 BC), c. 2300 BC can be considered typical for the start of the Bronze Age in Europe in general.

- c. 2300 BC, the Central European cultures of Unetice, Adlerberg, Straubing and pre-Lausitz started working bronze, a technique that reached them through the Balkans and Danube.
- c. 1800 BC, the culture of Los Millares, in Southwestern Spain, was substituted by that of El Argar, fully of the Bronze Age, which may well have been a centralised state.
- c. 1700 BC is considered a reasonable date to place the start of Mycenaean Greece, after centuries of infiltration of Indo-European Greeks of an unknown origin.
- c. 1600 BC, most of these Central European cultures were unified in the powerful Tumulus culture. Simultaneously but unrelatedly, the culture of El Argar started Phase B, which was characterised by a detectable Aegean influence (pithoi burials). About then, it is believed that Minoan Crete fell under the rule of the Mycenaean Greeks.
- Around 1300 BC, the Indo-European cultures of Central Europe, such as Celts, Italics and certainly Illyrians, changed the cultural phase conforming to the expansionist Urnfield culture, starting a quick expansion that brought them to occupy most of the Balkans, Asia Minor, where they destroyed the Hittite Empire (conquering the secret of iron smelting), northeastern Italy, parts of France, Belgium, the Netherlands, northeastern Spain and southwestern England.

Derivations of the sudden expansion were the Sea Peoples, who attacked Egypt unsuccessfully for some time, including the Philistines (Pelasgians?) and the Dorians, most likely Hellenised members of the group that ended invading Greek itself and destroying the might of Mycene and later Troy.

Simultaneously, around then, the culture of Vila Nova de Sao Pedro, which lasted 1300 years in its urban form, vanishes into a less spectacular one but finally with bronze. The centre of gravity of the Atlantic cultures (the Atlantic Bronze Age complex) was now displaced towards Great Britain. Also about then, the Villanovan culture, the possible precursor of the Etruscan civilisation, appeared in central Italy, possibly with an Aegean origin.

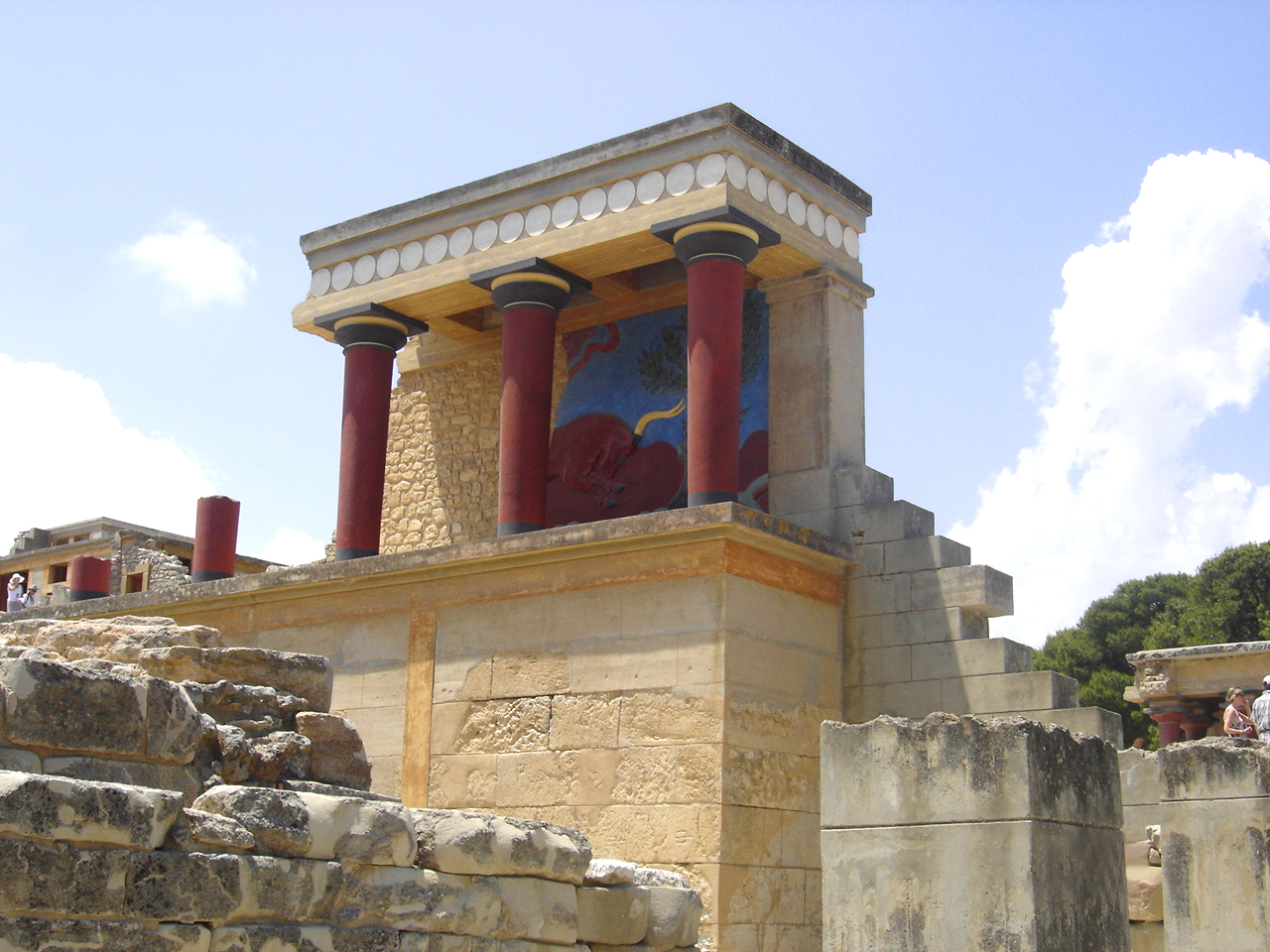
Minoan palace at Knossos, Crete, c. 1700 BC

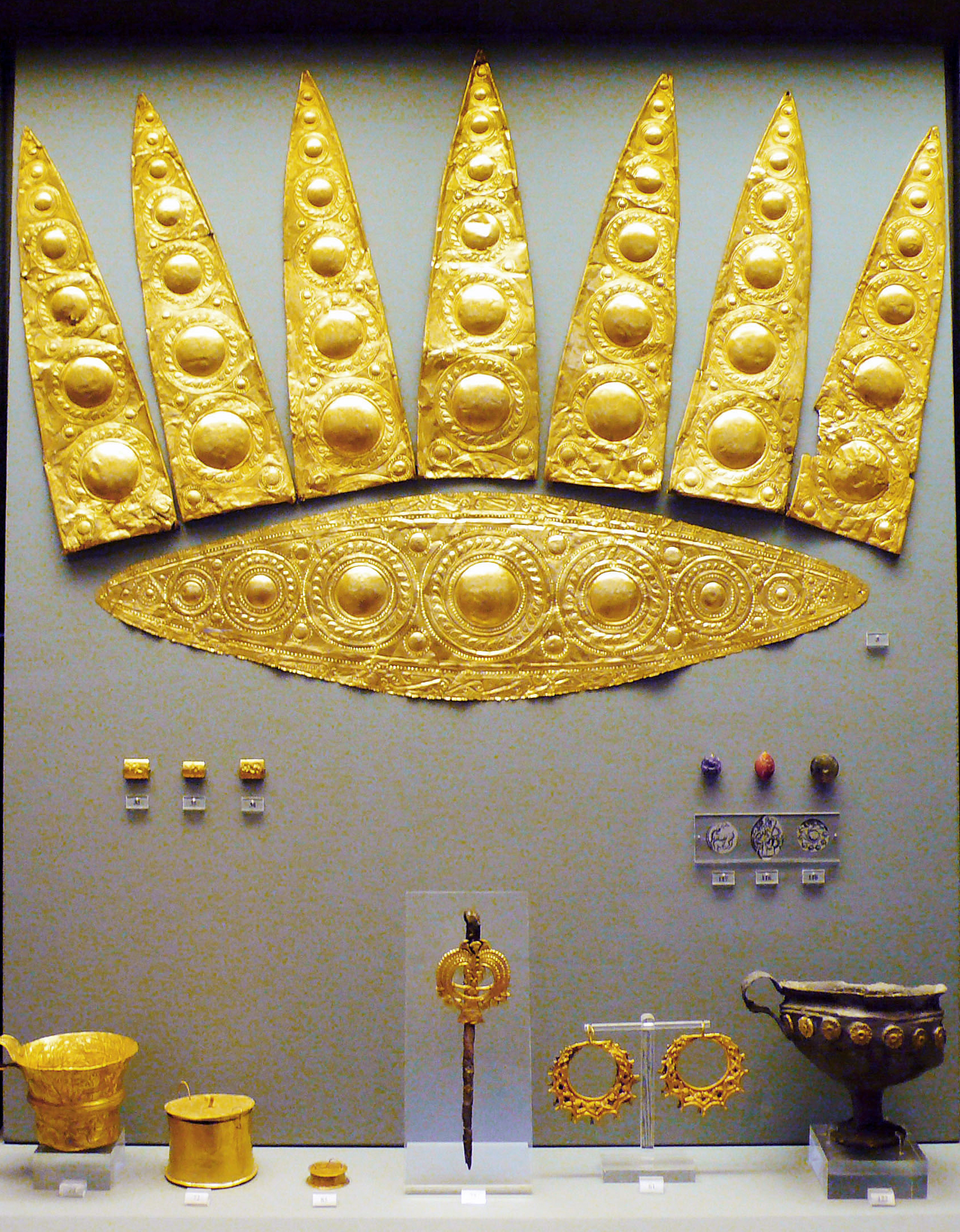
Mycenaean diadem, Greece, c. 1600 BC

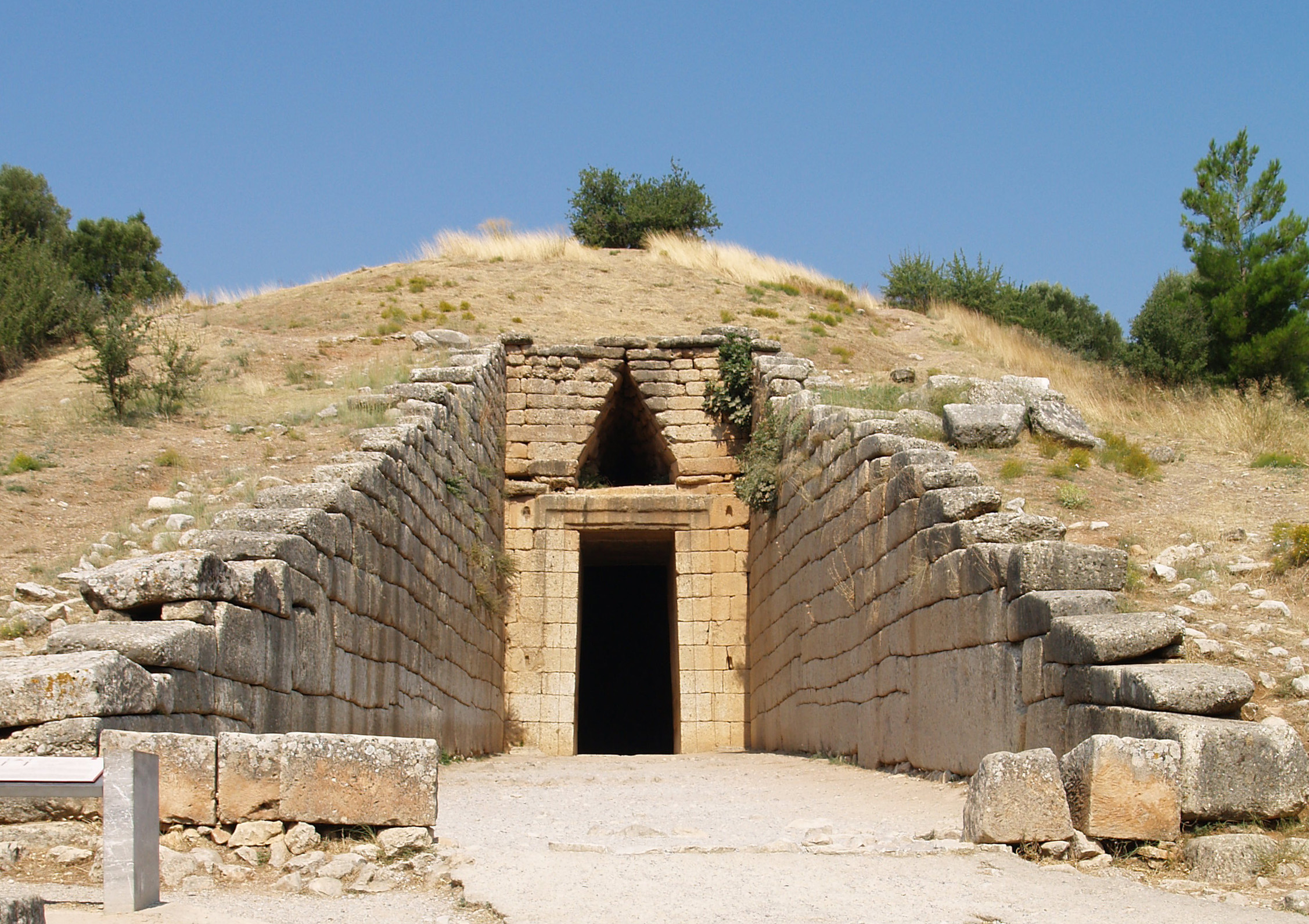
Treasury of Atreus, Greece, c. 1300 BC

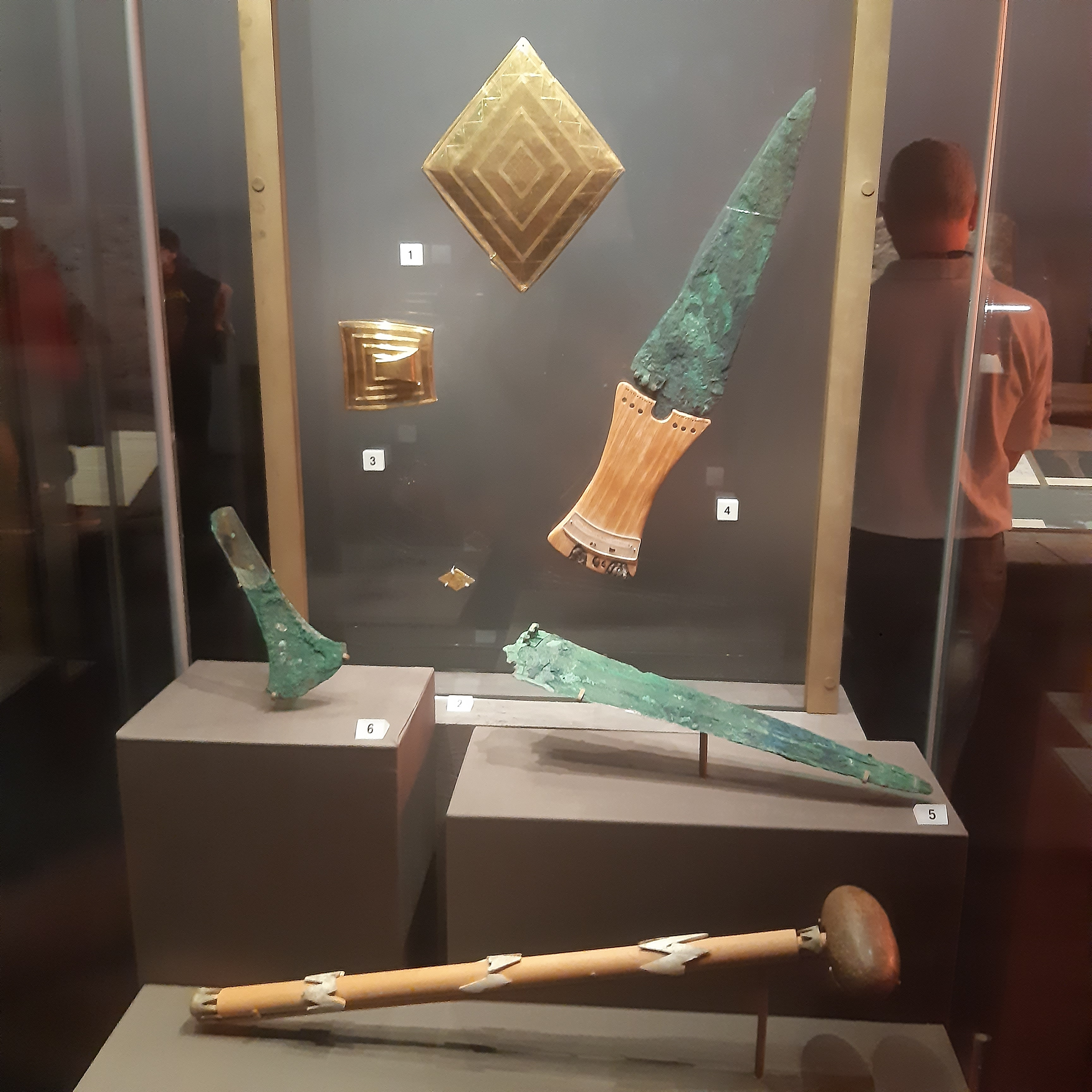
Bush Barrow, Britain, 1900 BC

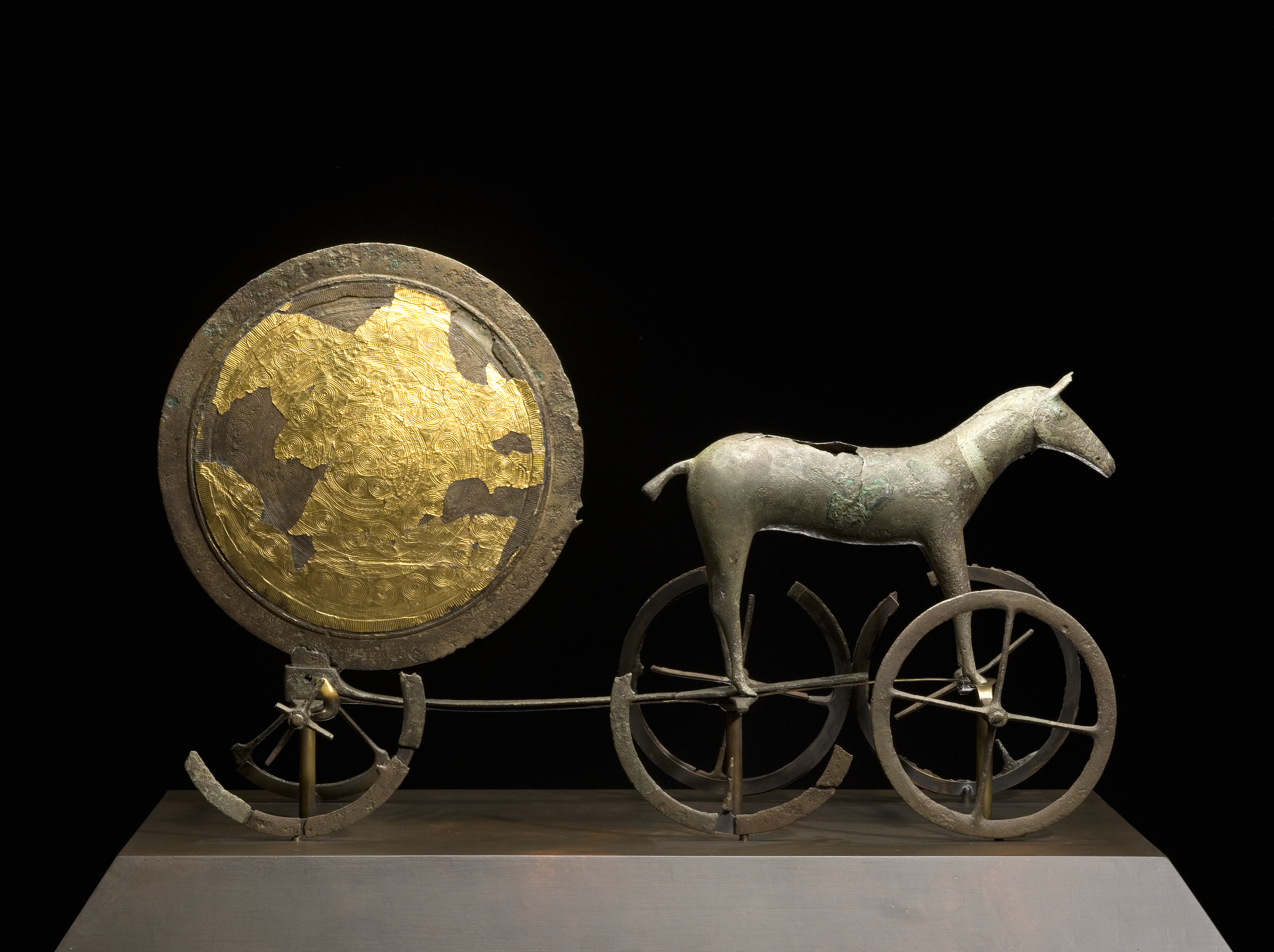
Trundholm Sun Chariot, Denmark, 1500 BC

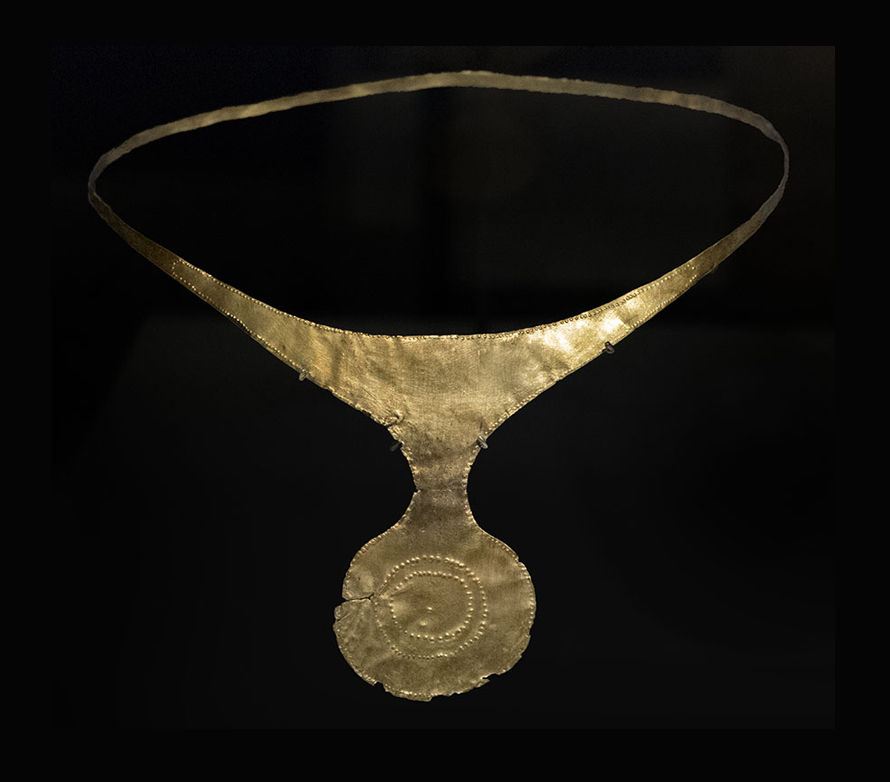
Argaric culture gold diadem, Spain, 1600 BC

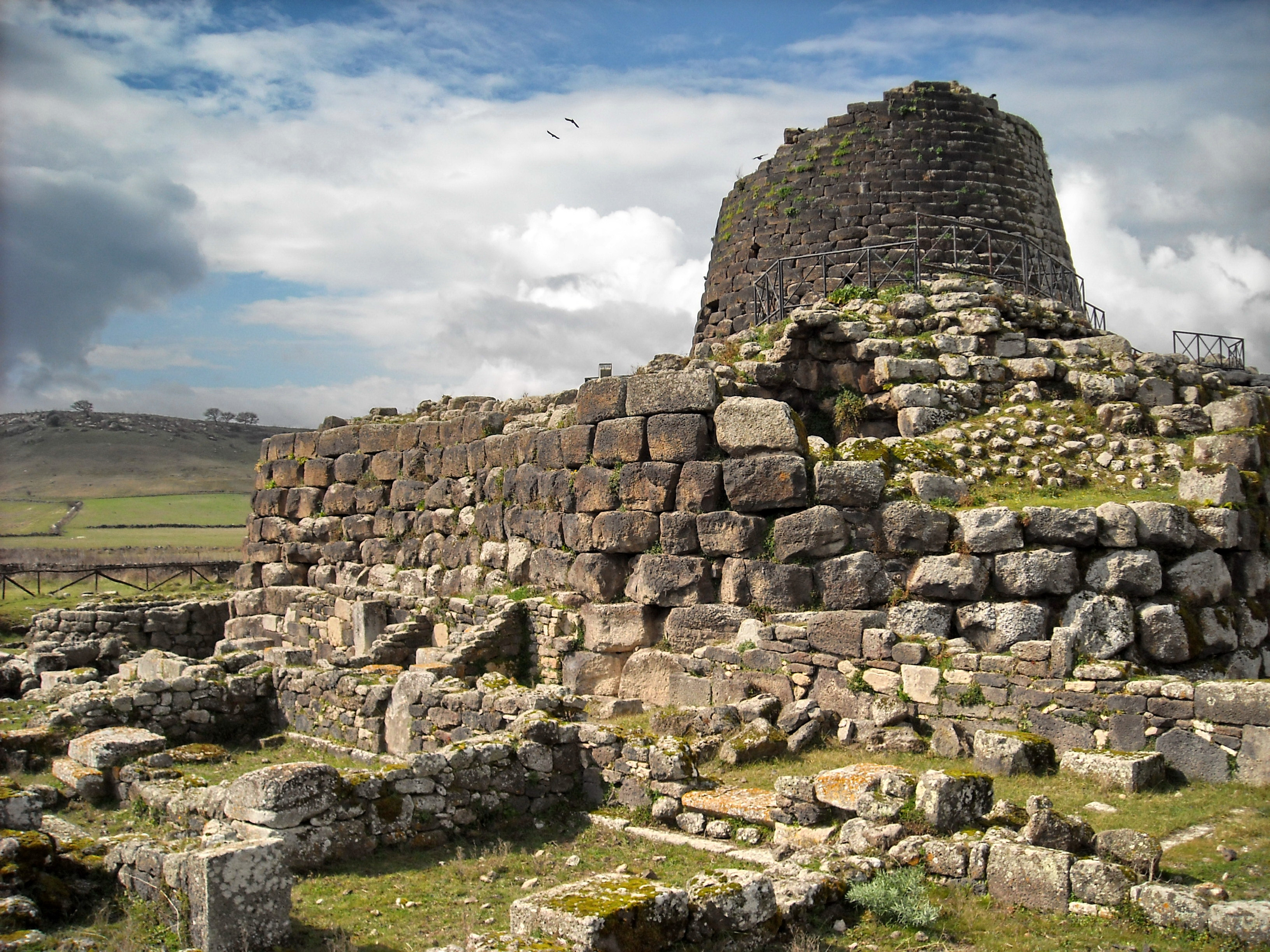
Nuraghe Santu Antine in Torralba, Sardinia, Italy, c. 1600 BC

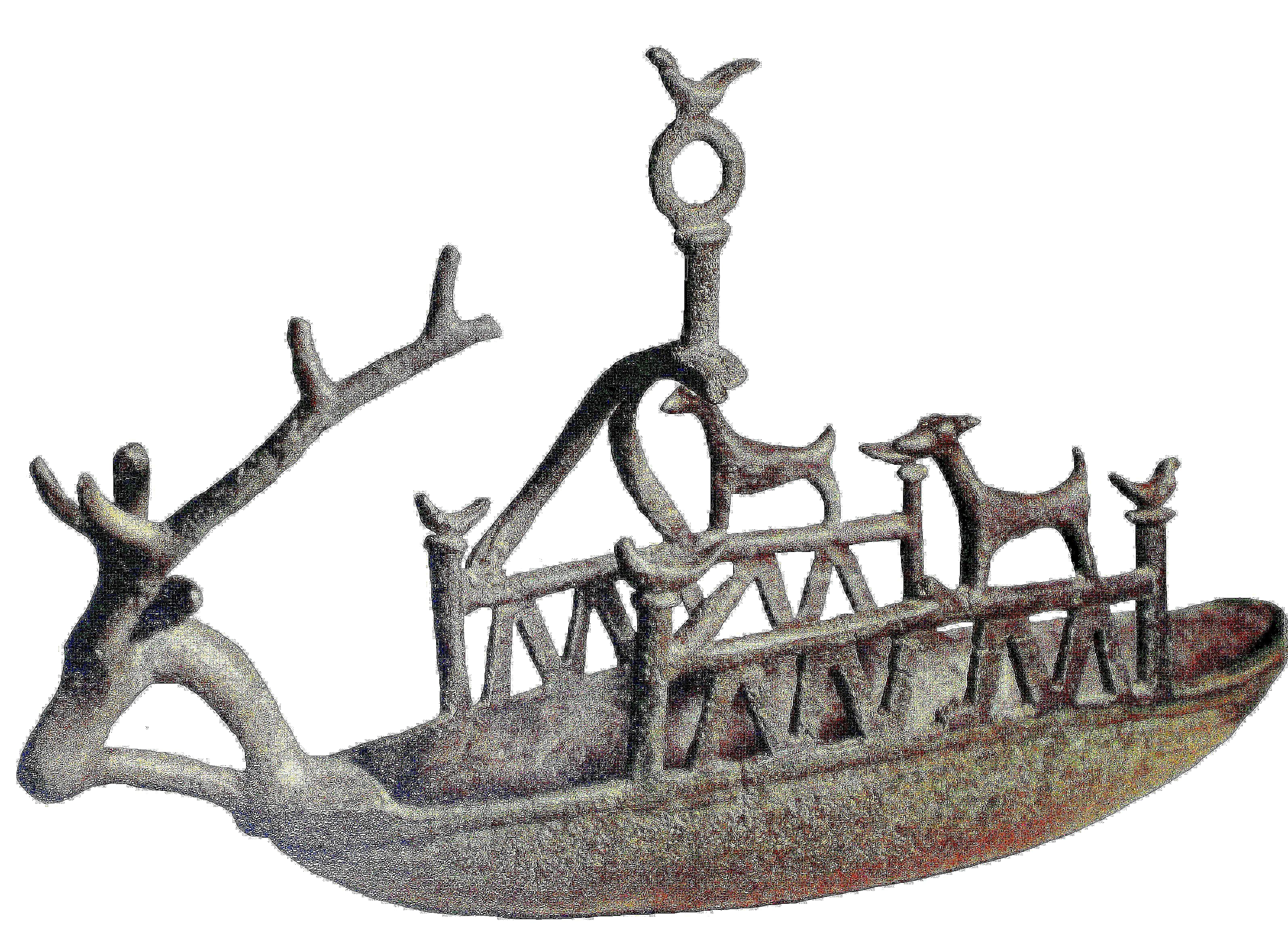
Nuragic ship model, Sardinia, 1000 BC

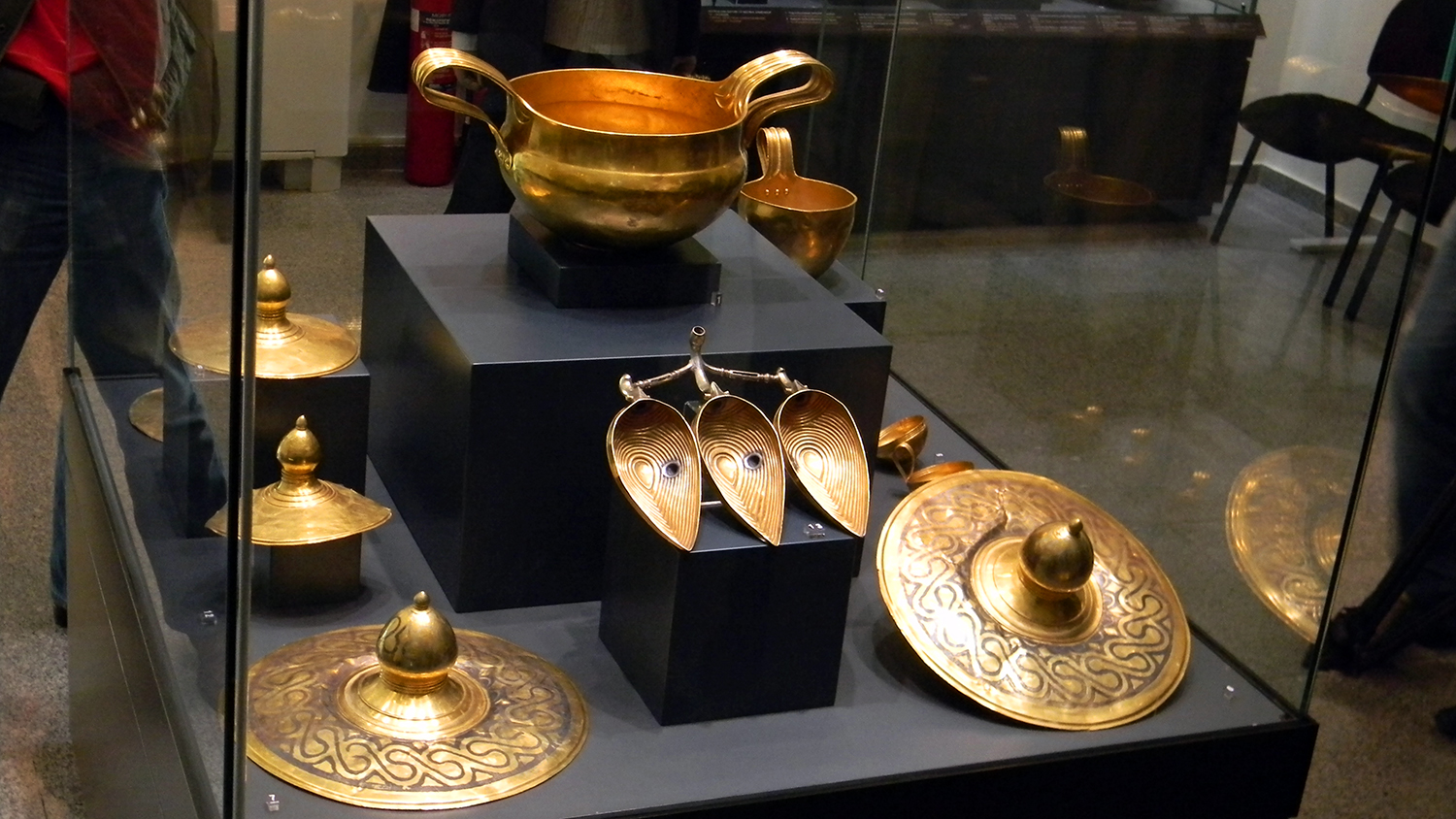
Valchitran treasure, Bulgaria, c. 1300 BC

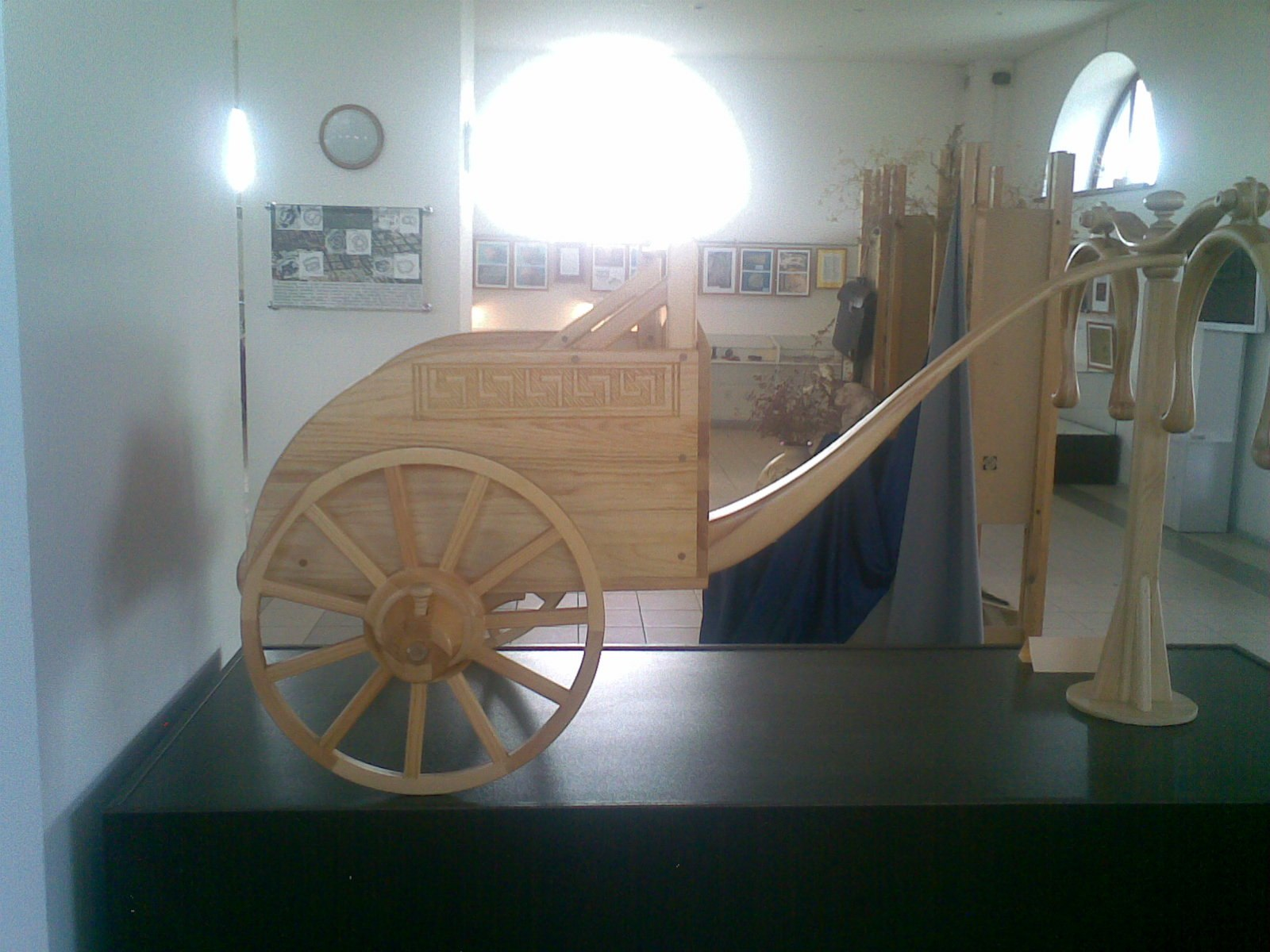
Sintashta culture chariot, Russia, c. 2000 BC

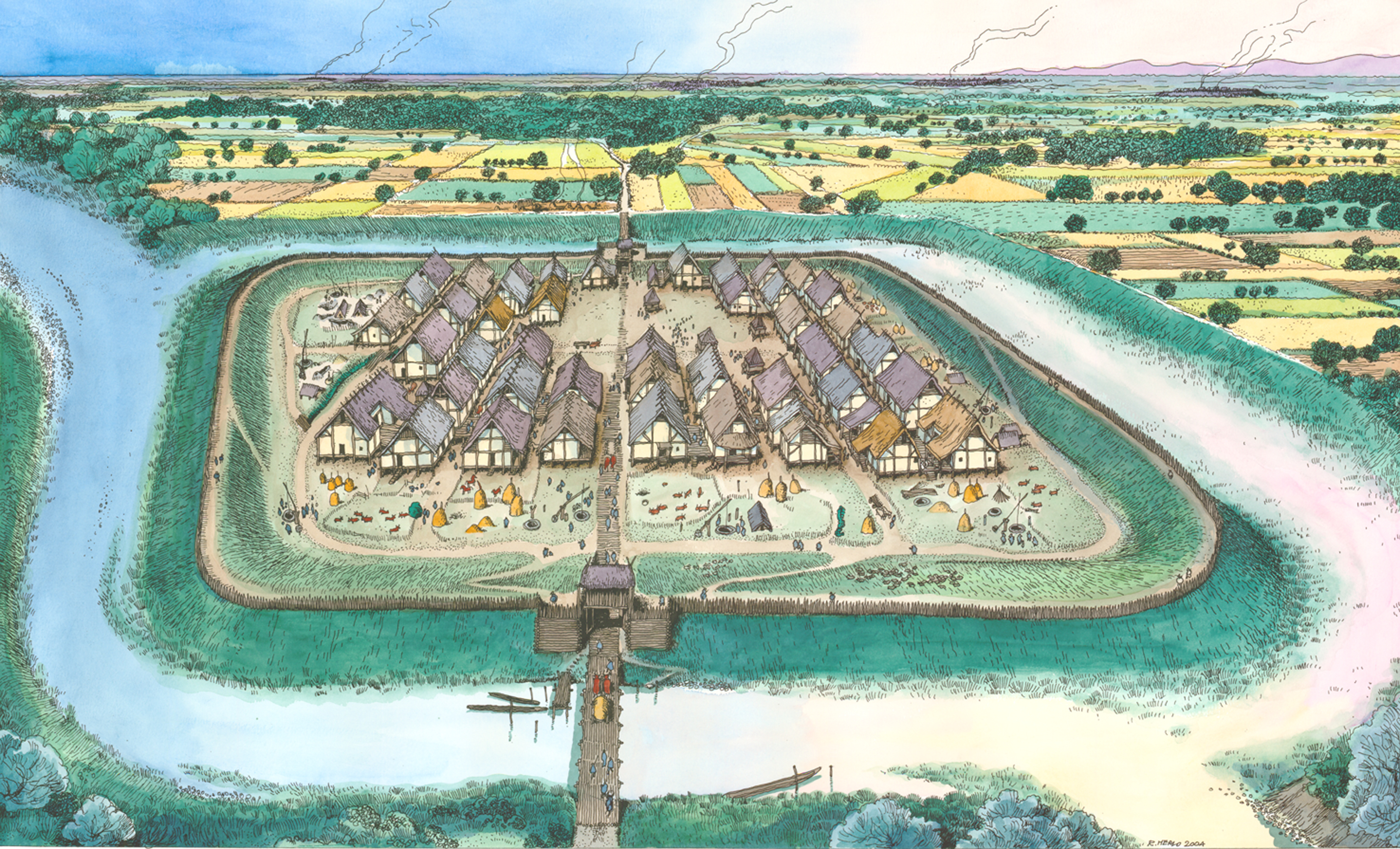
Terramare culture, Italy, 1650–1150 BC

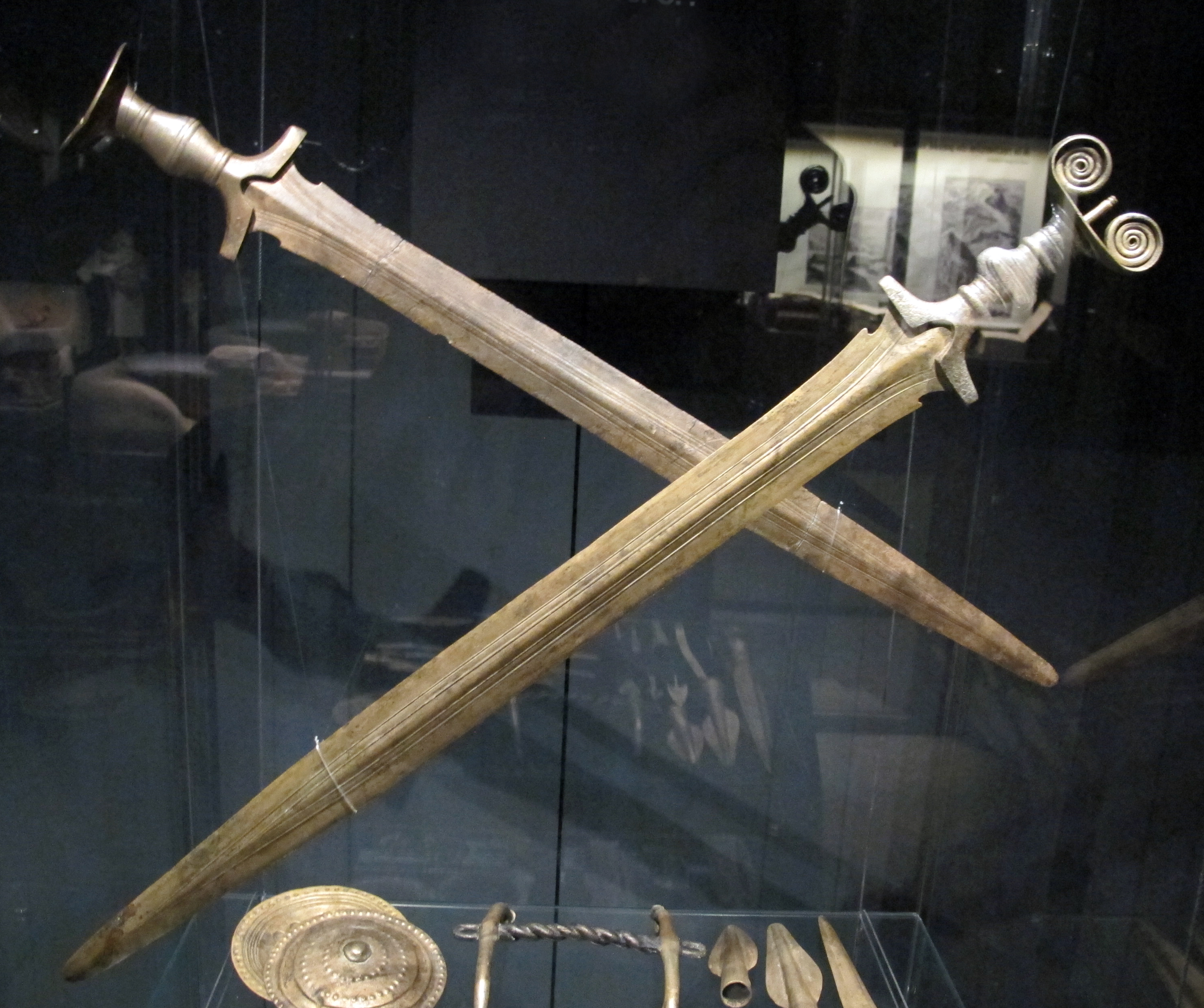
Bronze swords, Switzerland, 1000 BC

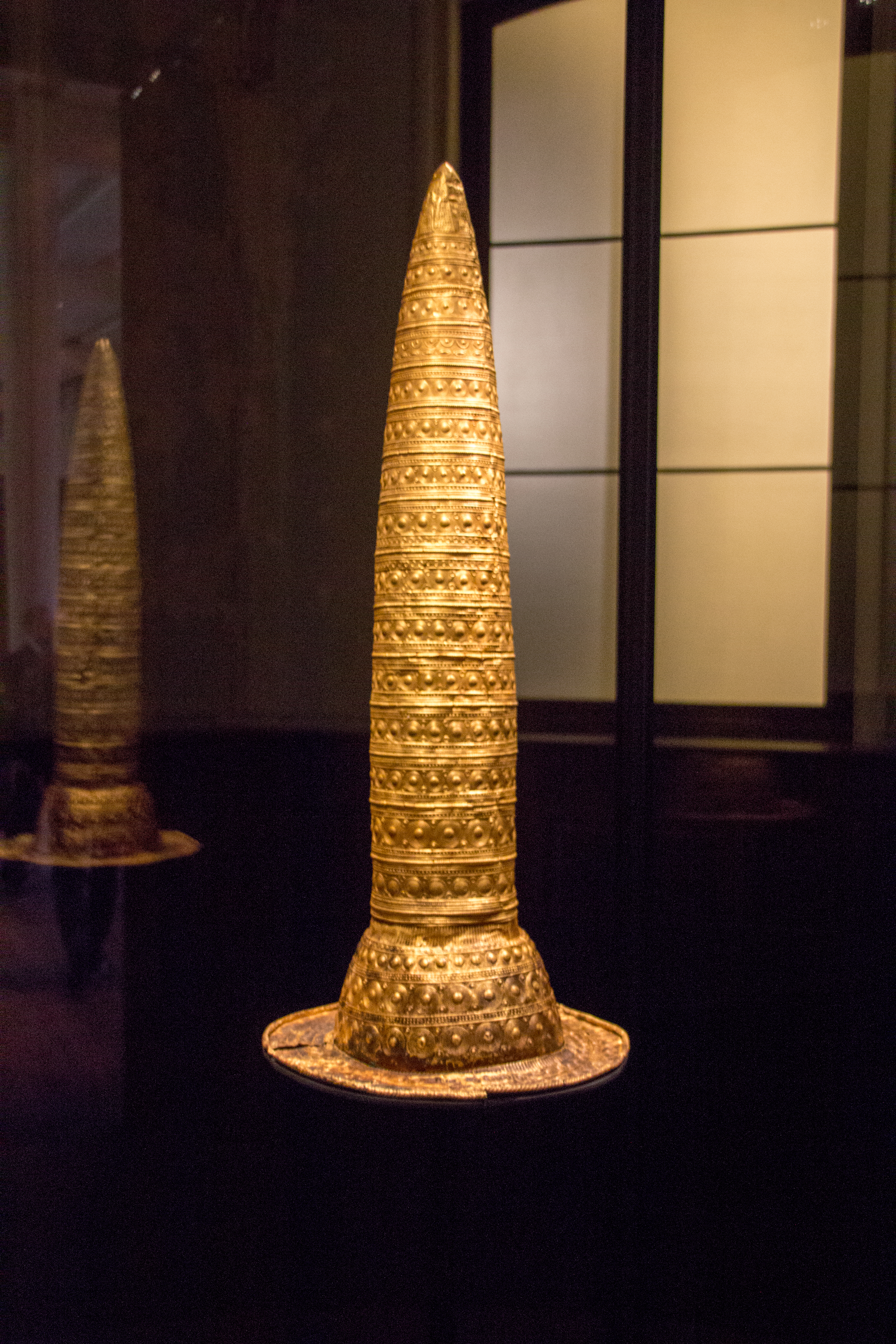
Berlin Gold Hat, Germany, c. 1000 BC

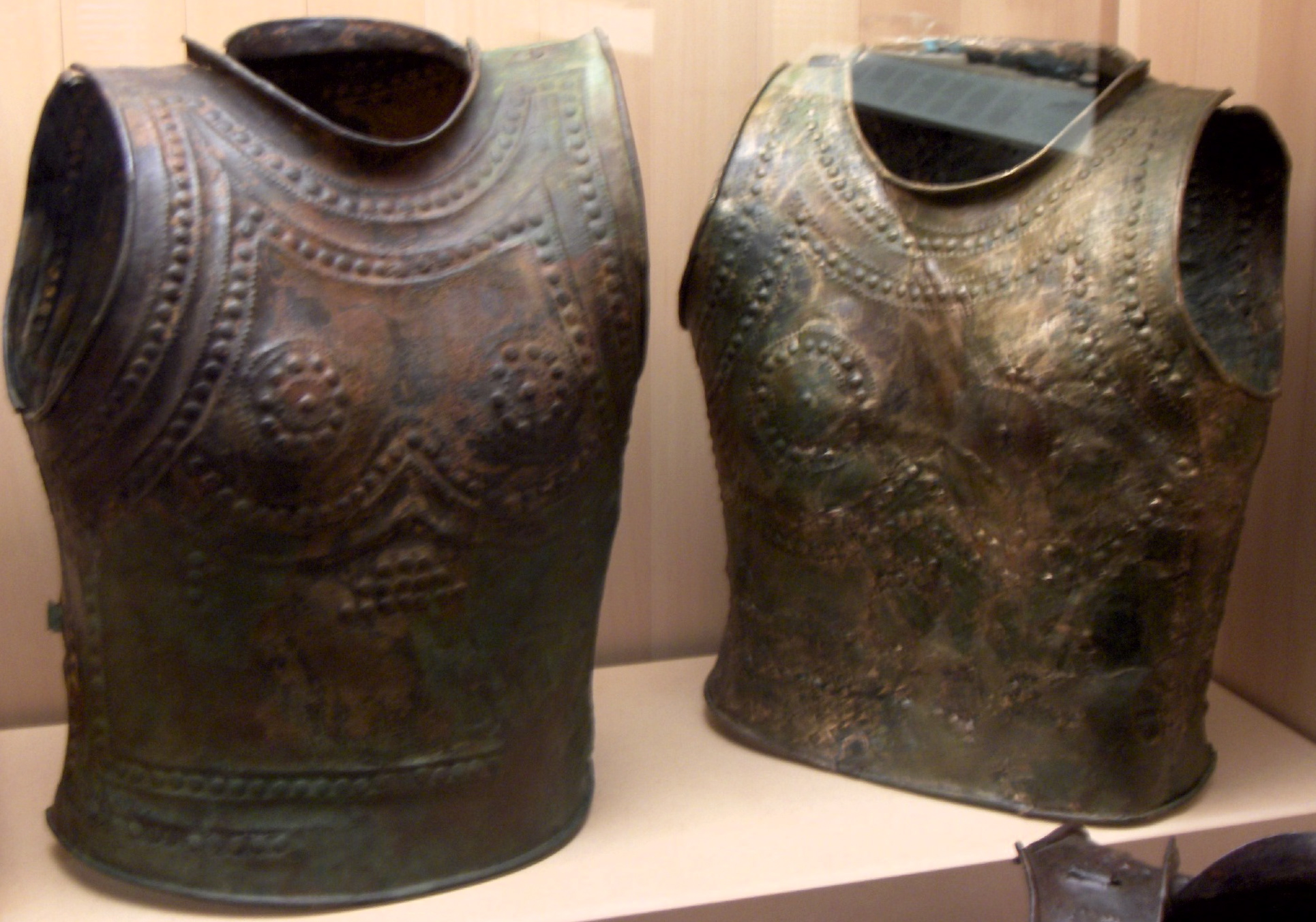
Bronze cuirasses, France, c. 900 BC

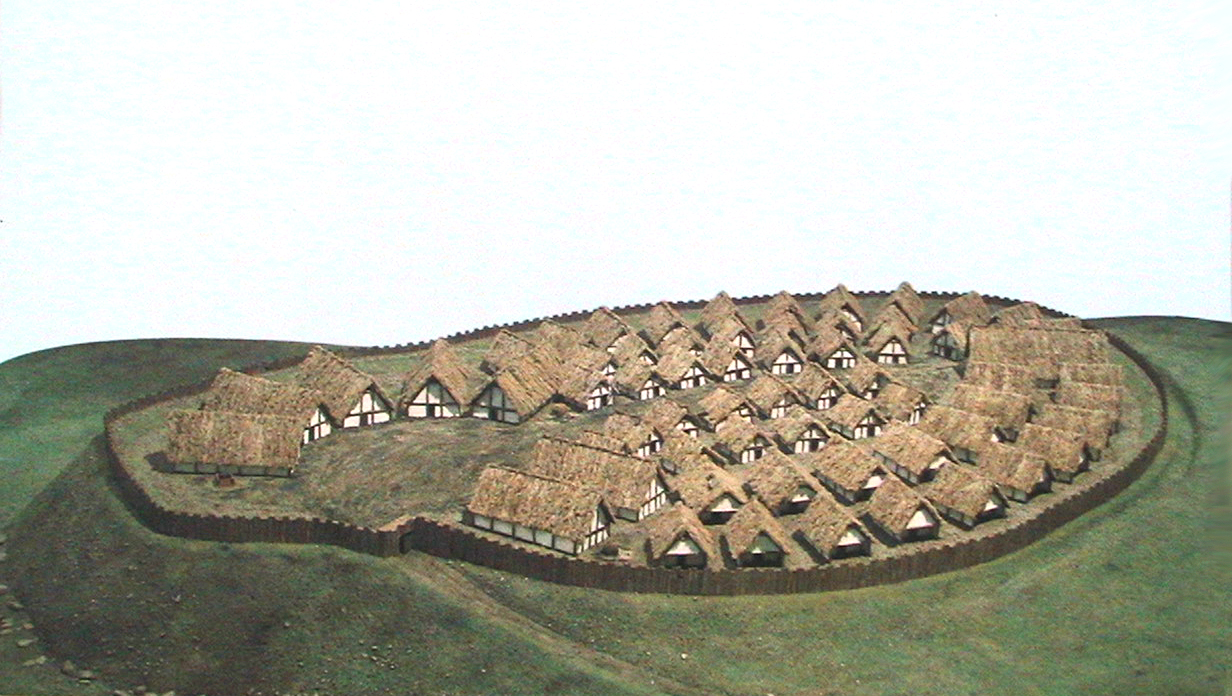
Urnfield culture, Germany, c. 1100 BC

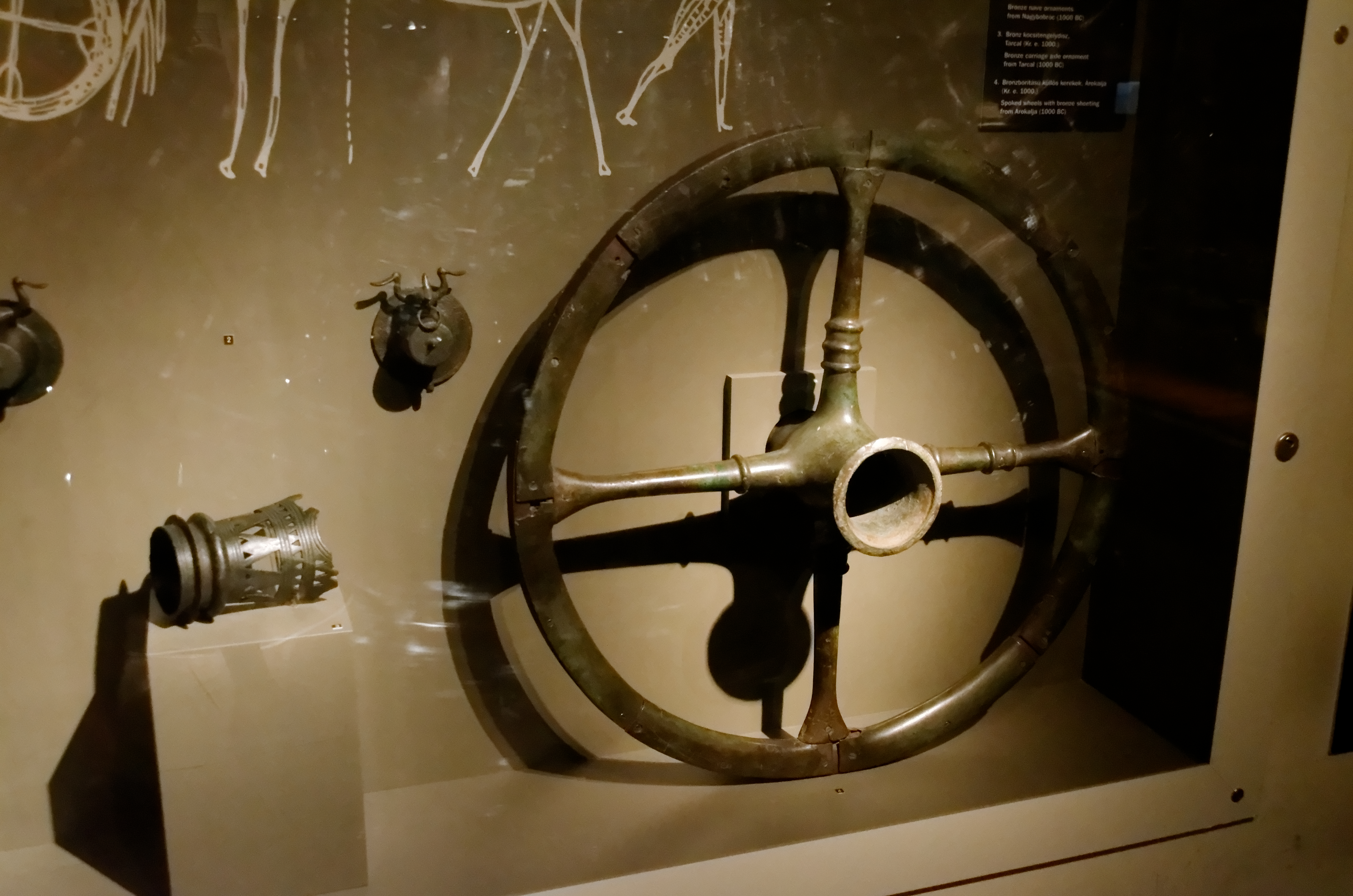
Bronze chariot wheel, Romania, c. 13th century BC

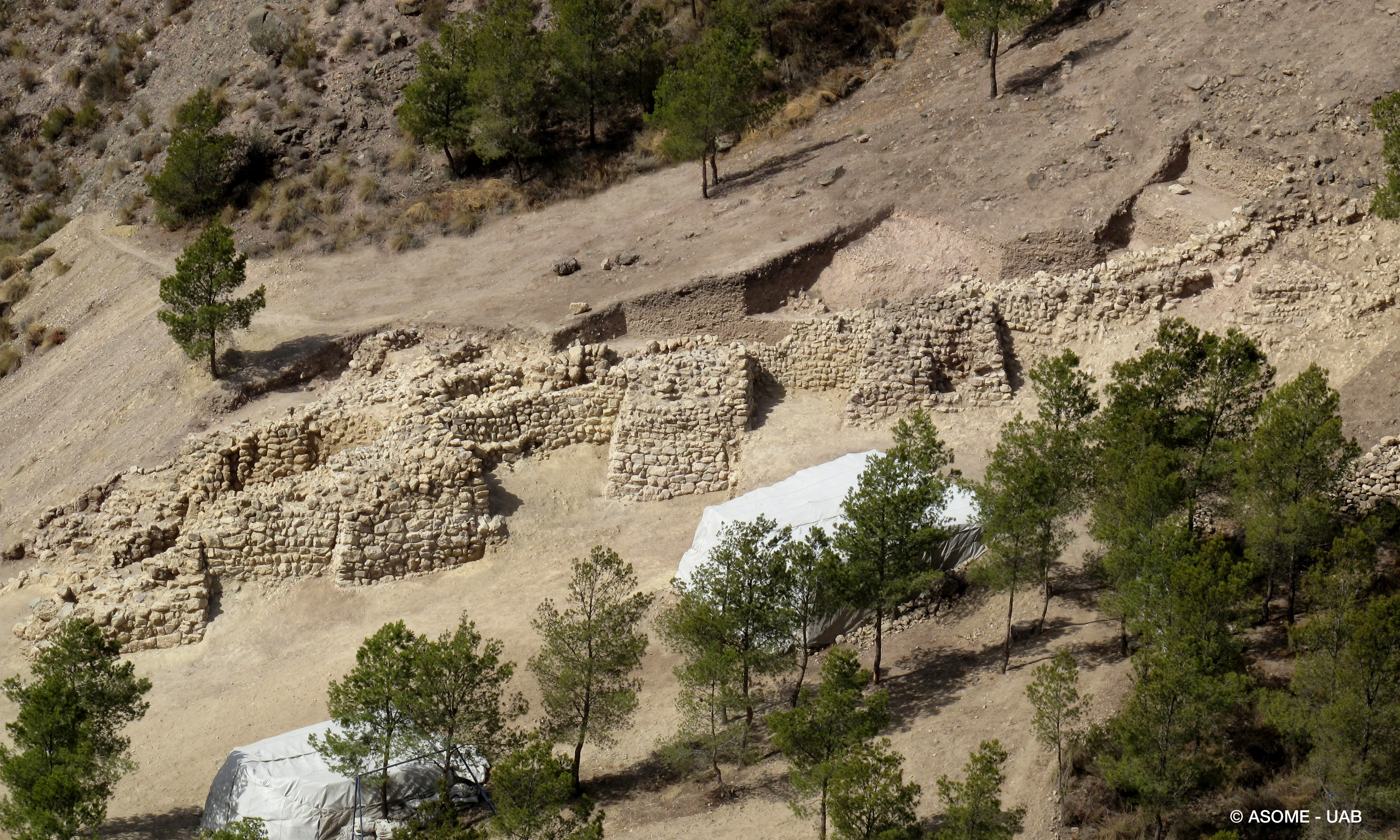
Ruins of La Bastita de Totana, Spain, c. 1600 BC

== Iron Age ==
Though the use of iron was known to the Aegean peoples about 1100 BC, it failed to reach Central Europe before 800 BC, when it gave way to the Hallstatt culture, an Iron Age evolution of the Urnfield culture.

Around then, the Phoenicians, benefitting from the disappearance of the Greek maritime power (Greek Dark Ages) founded their first colony at the entrance of the Atlantic Ocean, in Gadir (modern Cádiz), most likely as a merchant outpost to convey the many mineral resources of Iberia and the British Isles.

Nevertheless, from the 7th century BC onwards, the Greeks recovered their power and started their own colonial expansion, founding Massalia (modern Marseille) and the Iberian outpost of Emporion (modern Empúries). That occurred only after the Iberians could reconquer Catalonia and the Ebro valley from the Celts, separating physically the Iberian Celts from their continental neighbours.

The second phase of the European Iron Age was defined particularly by the Celtic La Tène culture, which started around 400 BC, followed by a large expansion of them into the Balkans, the British Isles, where they assimilated druidism, and other regions of France and Italy.

The decline of Celtic power under the expansive pressure of Germanic tribes (originally from Scandinavia and Lower Germany) and the forming of the Roman Empire during the 1st century BC was also that of the end of prehistory, properly speaking; though many regions of Europe remained illiterate and therefore out of reach of written history for many centuries, the boundary must be placed somewhere, and that date, near the start of the calendar, seems to be quite convenient. The remaining is regional prehistory, or, in most cases, protohistory, but no longer European prehistory, as a whole.

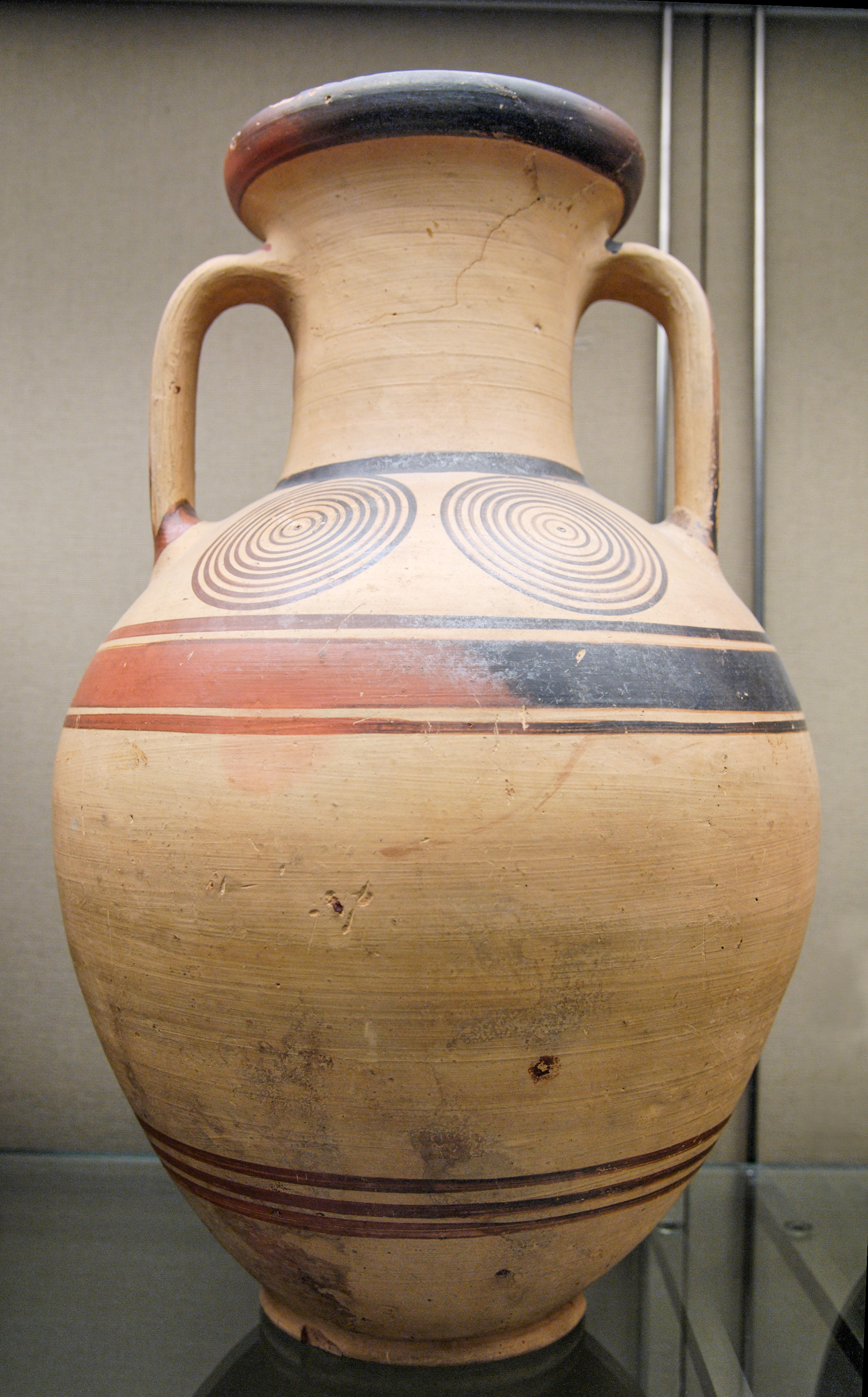
Protogeometric amphora, Greece, c. 975–950 BC

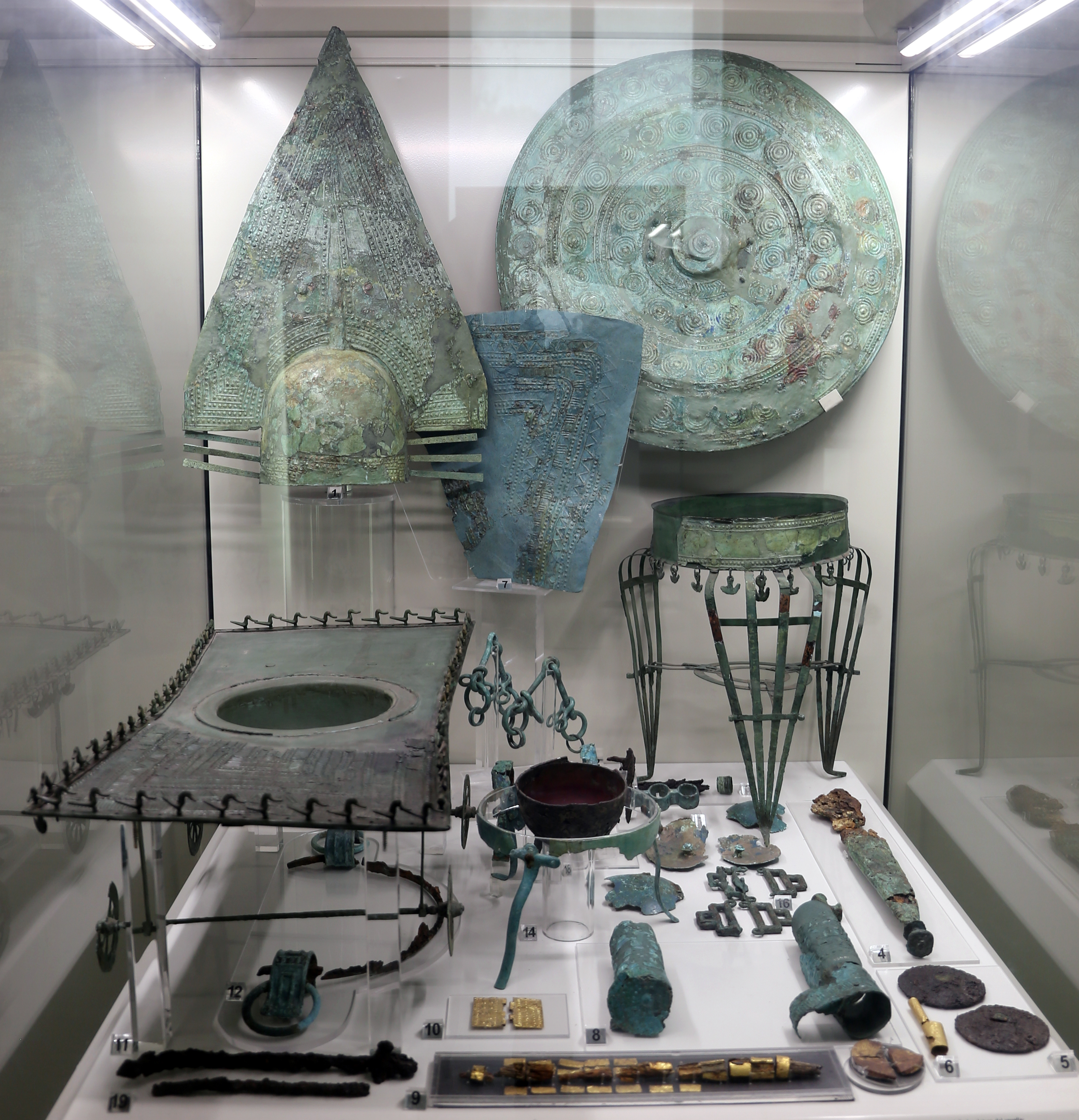
Villanovan culture warrior burial, Italy, 730 BC

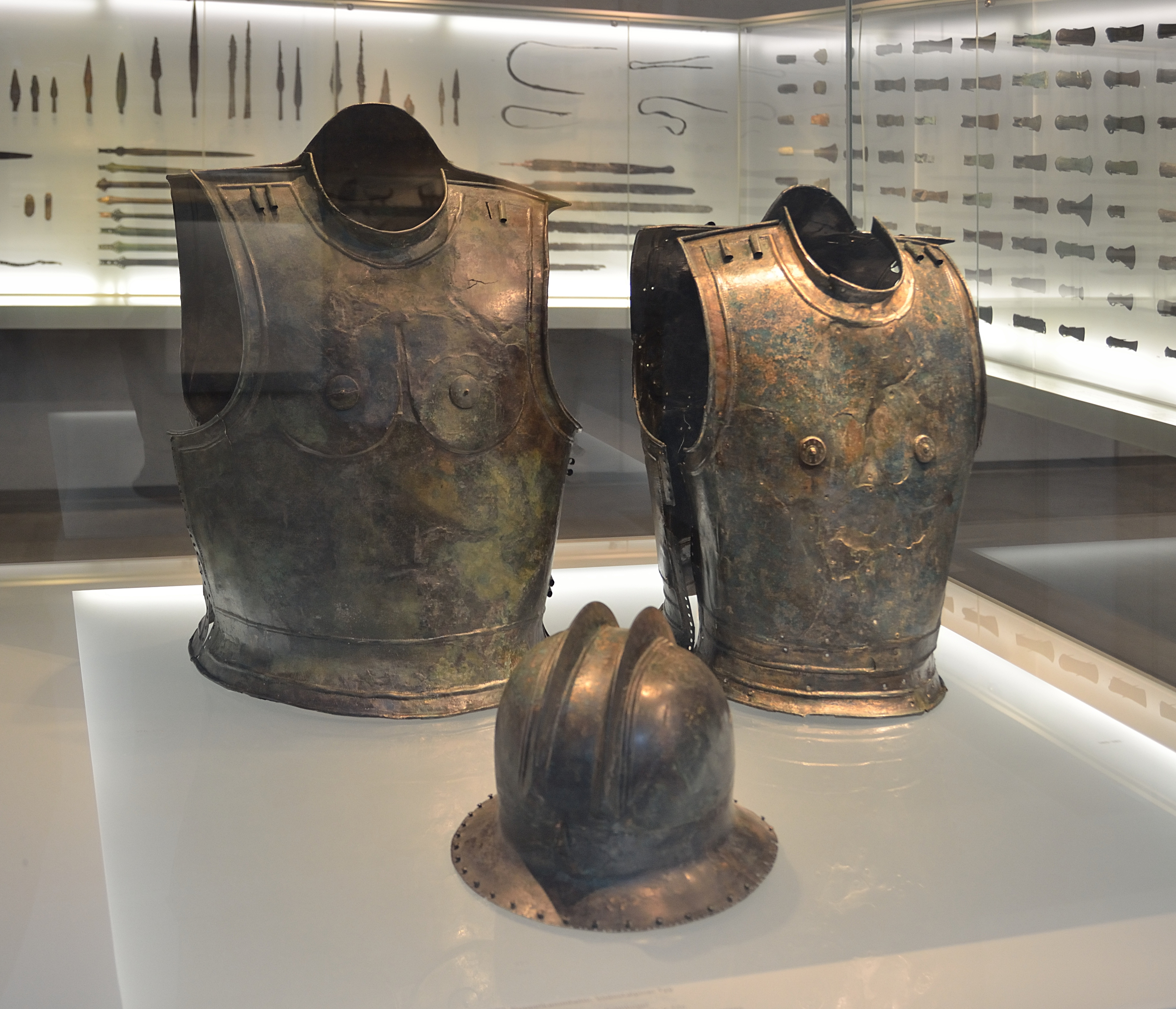
Hallstatt culture armour, Austria, 7th century BC

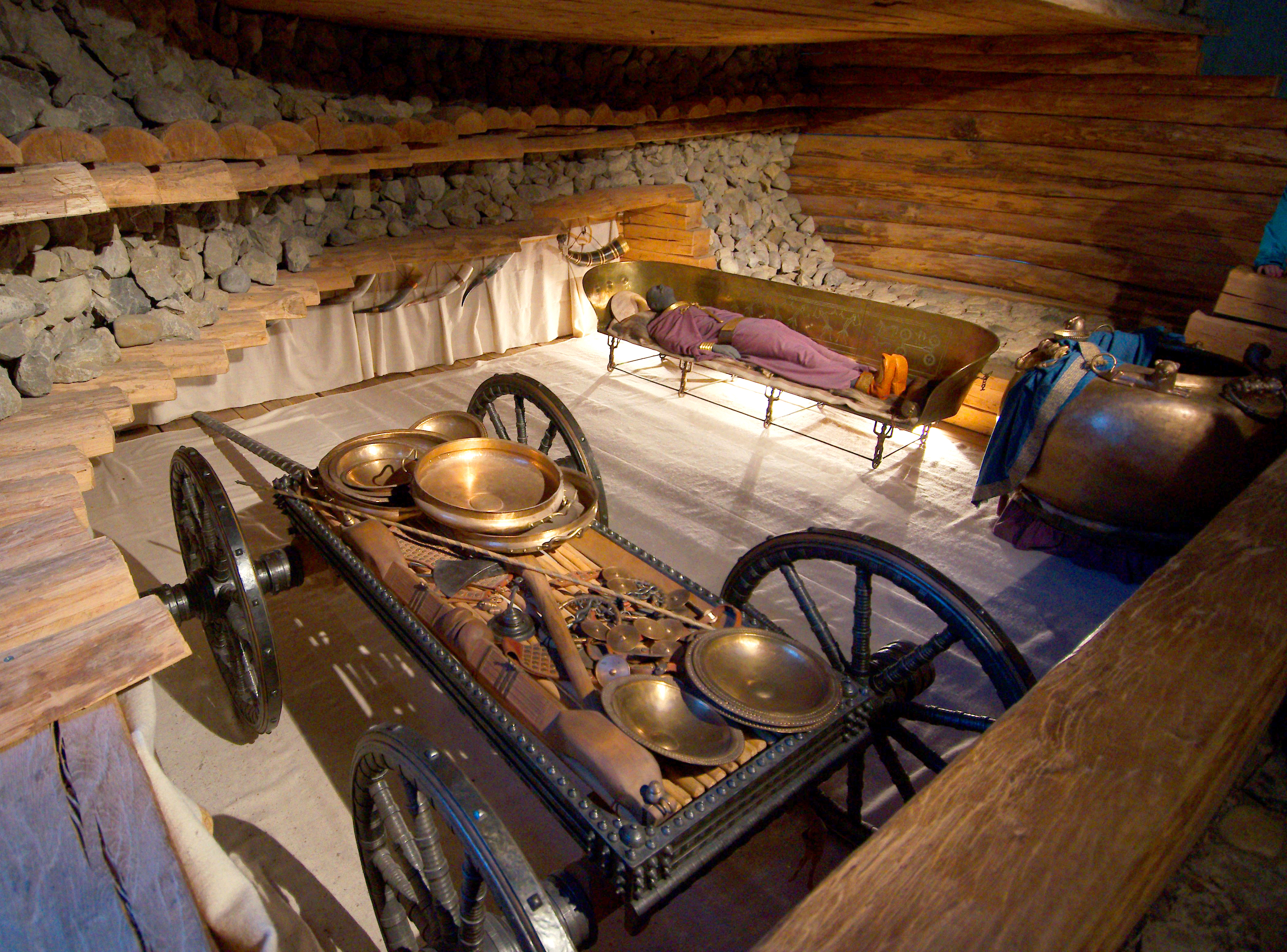
Celtic Hochdorf Grave, Germany, 530 BC

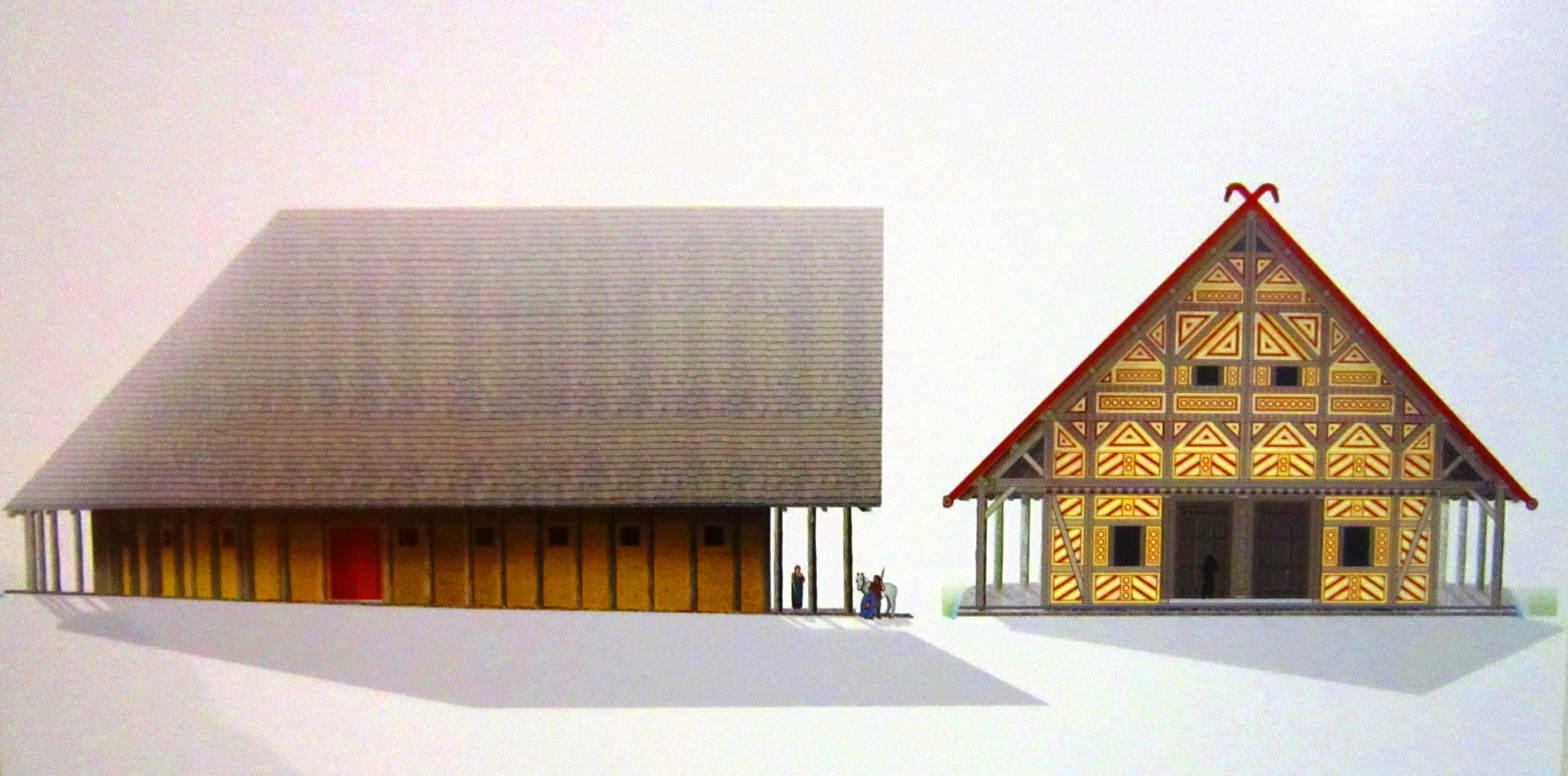
Vix palace, Hallstatt culture, France, 500 BC

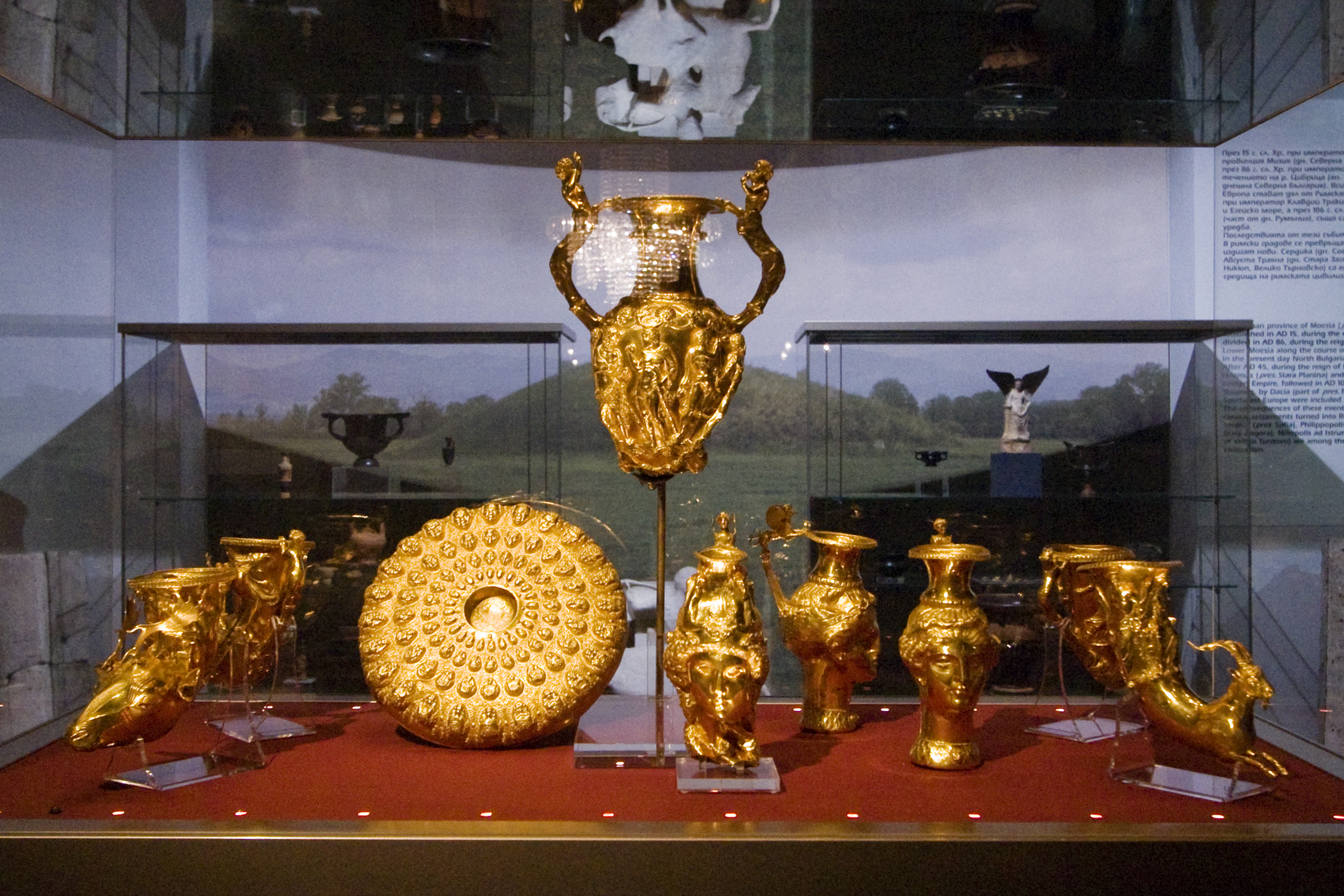
Panagyurishte Treasure, Bulgaria, 400–300 BC

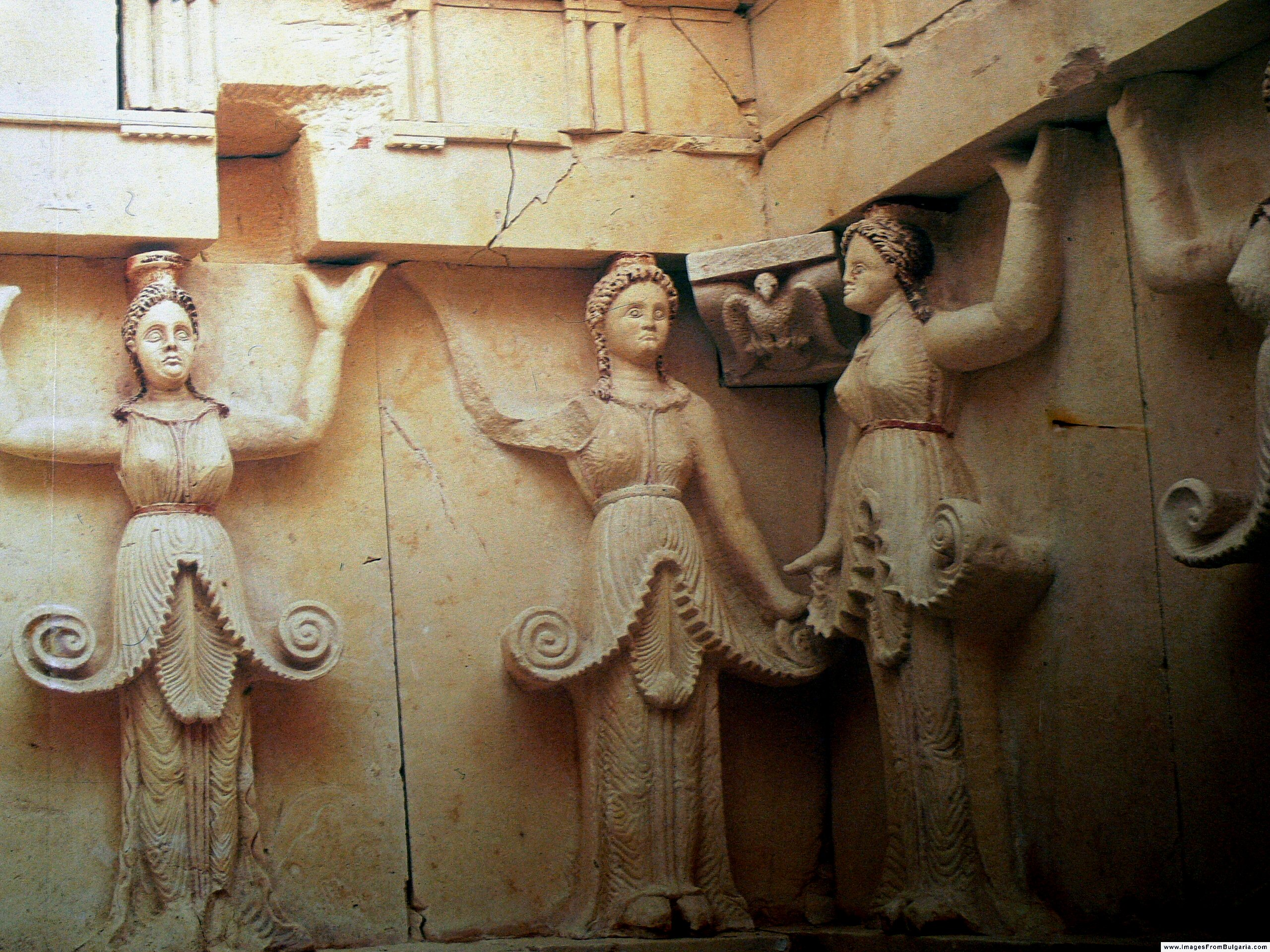
Thracian tomb, Bulgaria, 3rd century BC

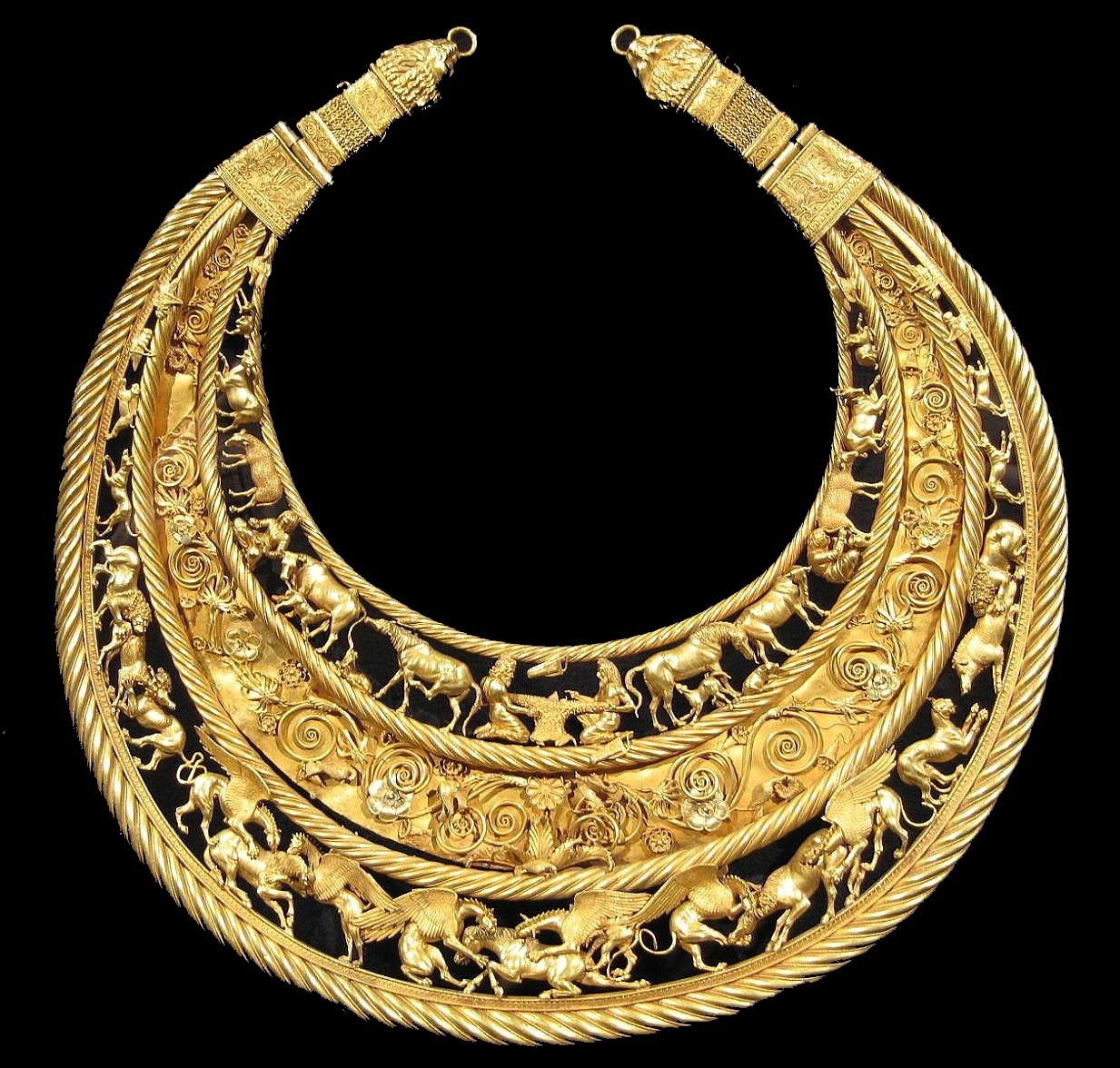
Scythian gold pectoral, Ukraine, 4th century BC

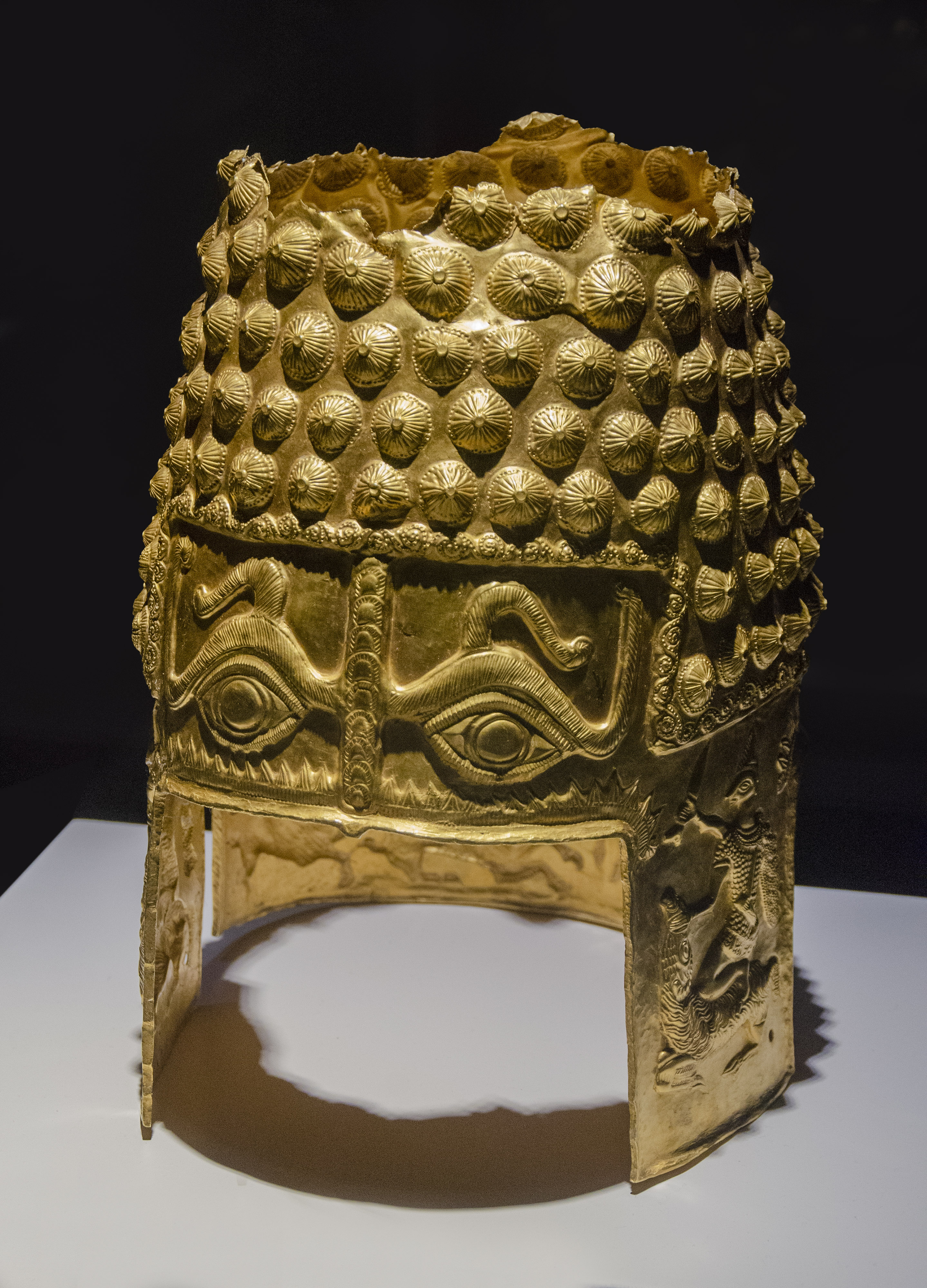
Geto-Dacian gold helmet, Romania, c. 400 BC

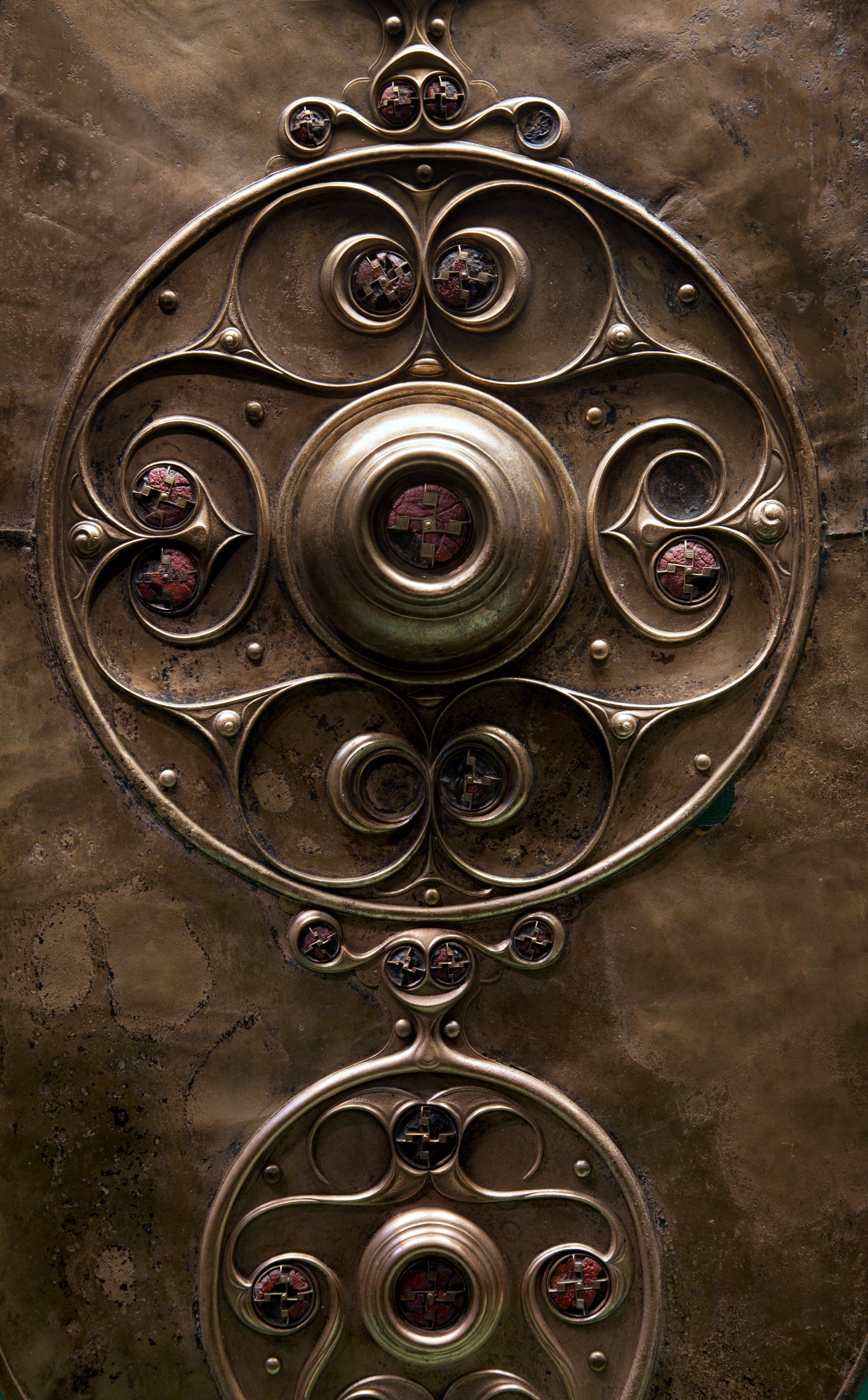
Battersea Shield, Britain, c. 350–50 BC

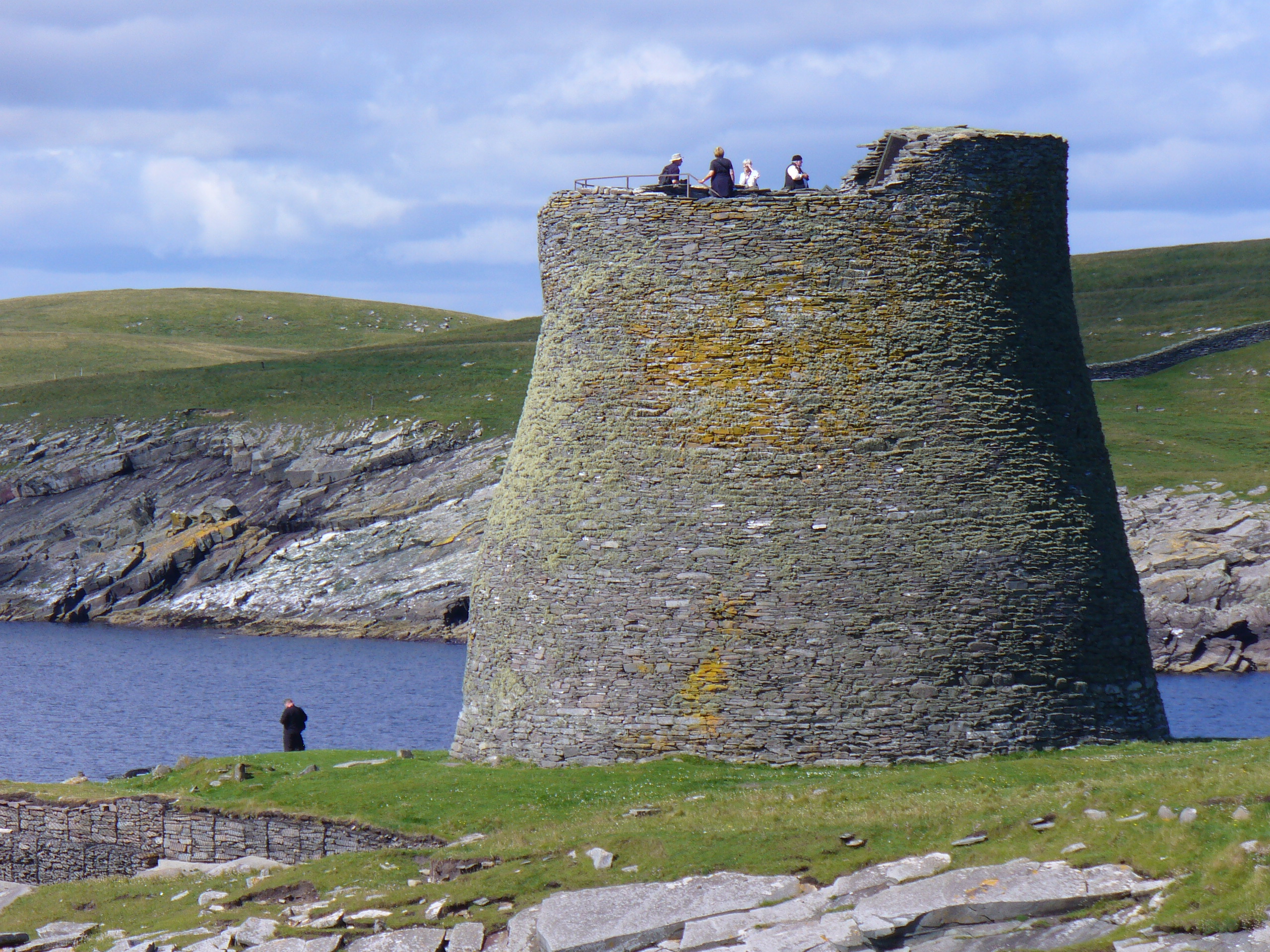
Broch of Mousa, Scotland, c. 300-100 BC

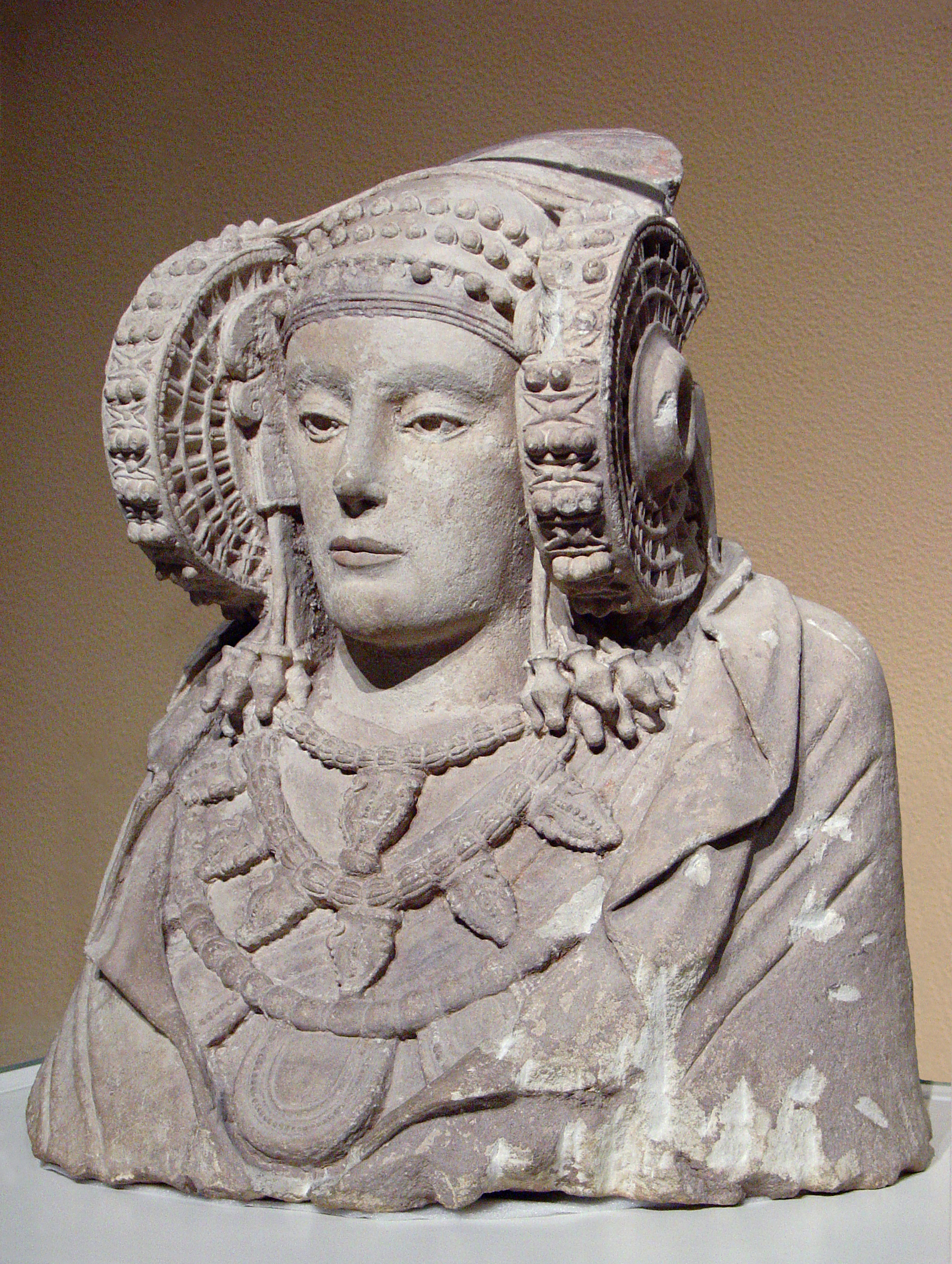
Lady of Elche, Spain, 4th century BC

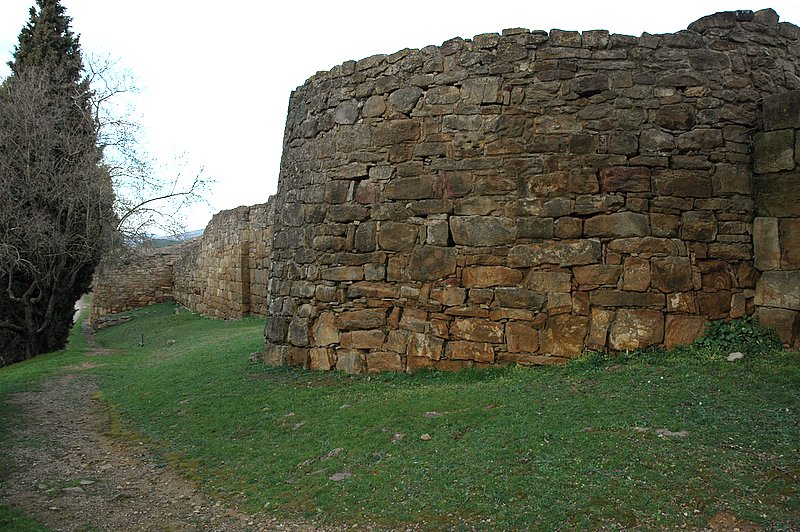
Walls of Ullastret, Spain

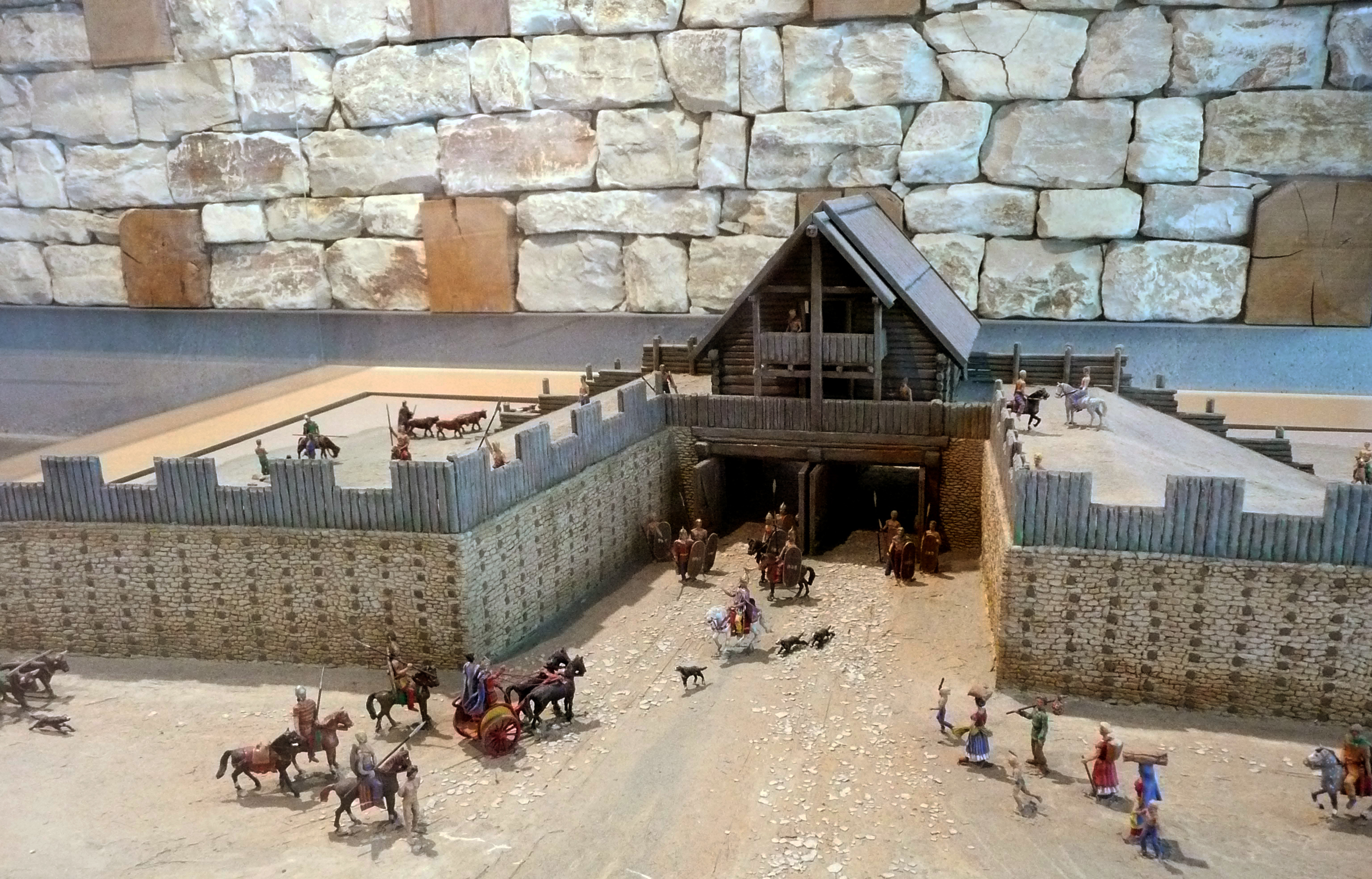
Celtic oppidum of Manching, Germany, 2nd century BC

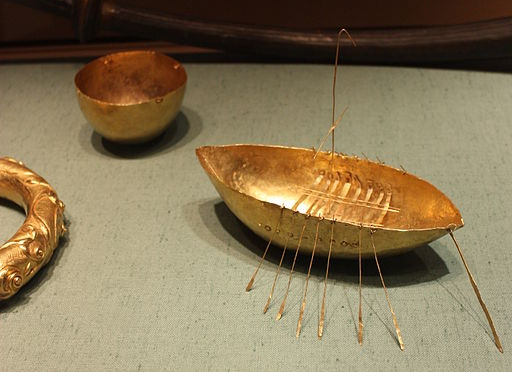
Broighter gold boat, Ireland, c. 100 BC

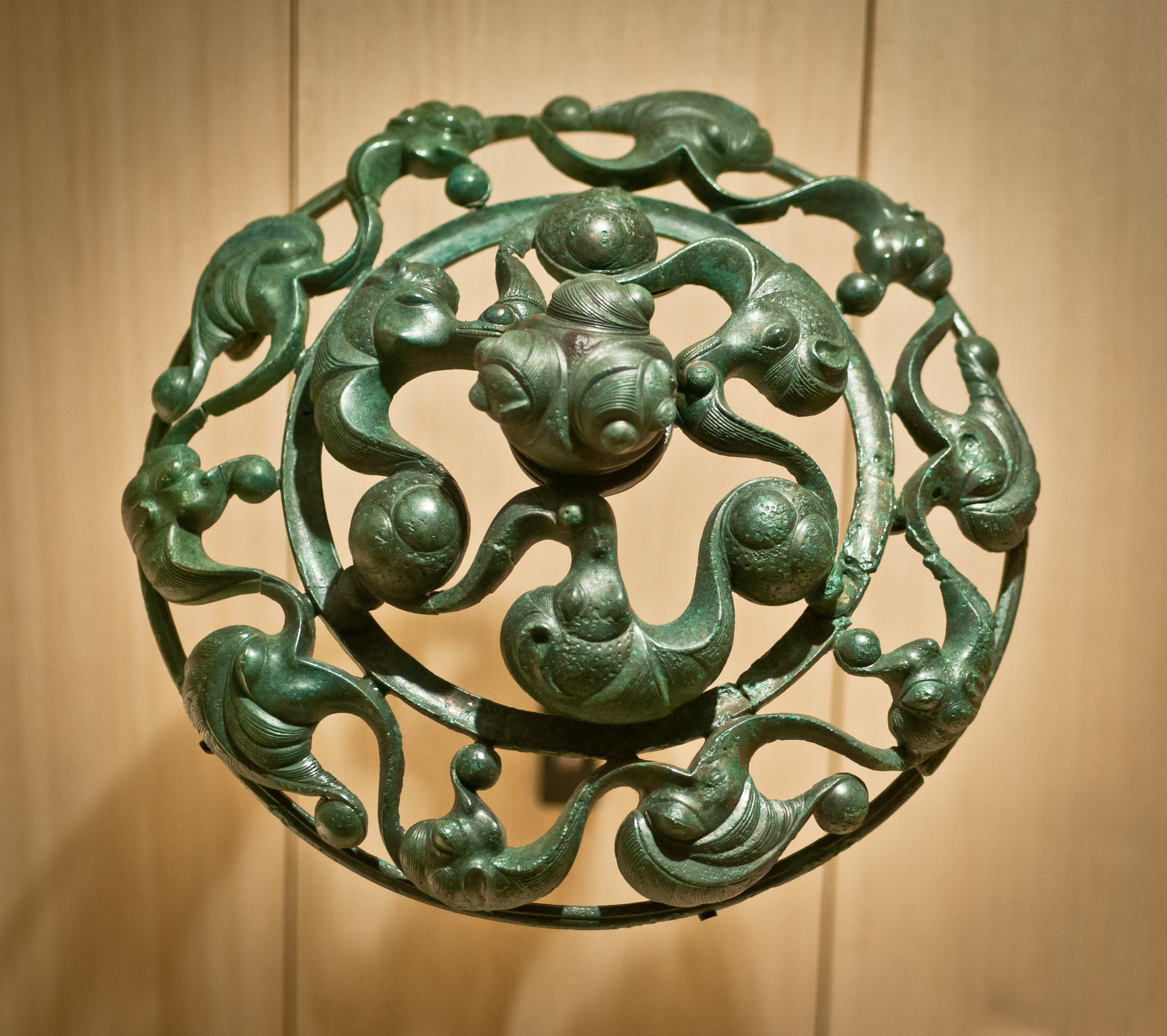
Chariot fitting, La Tène culture, France

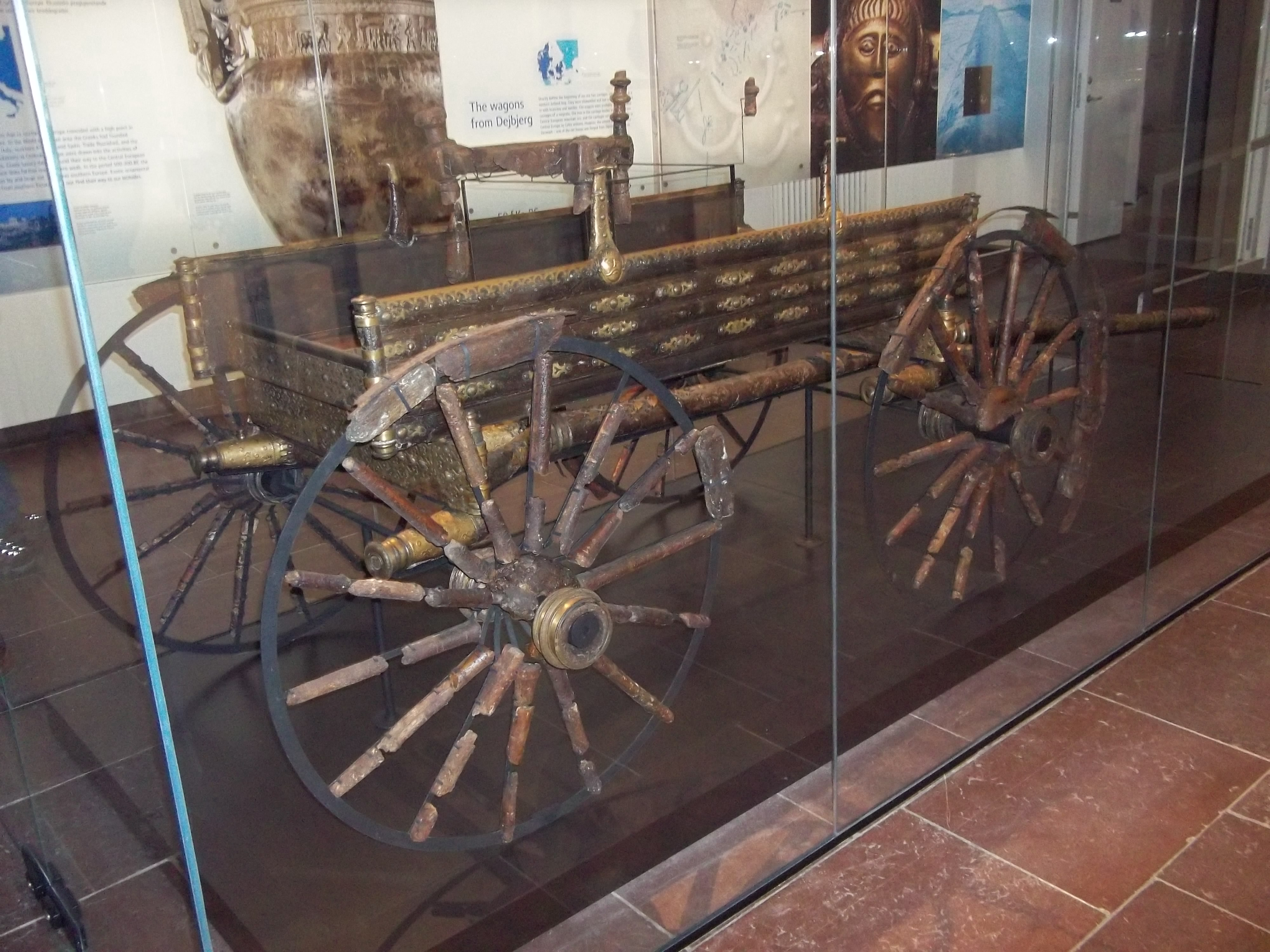
Dejbjerg wagon, Denmark, 1st century BC

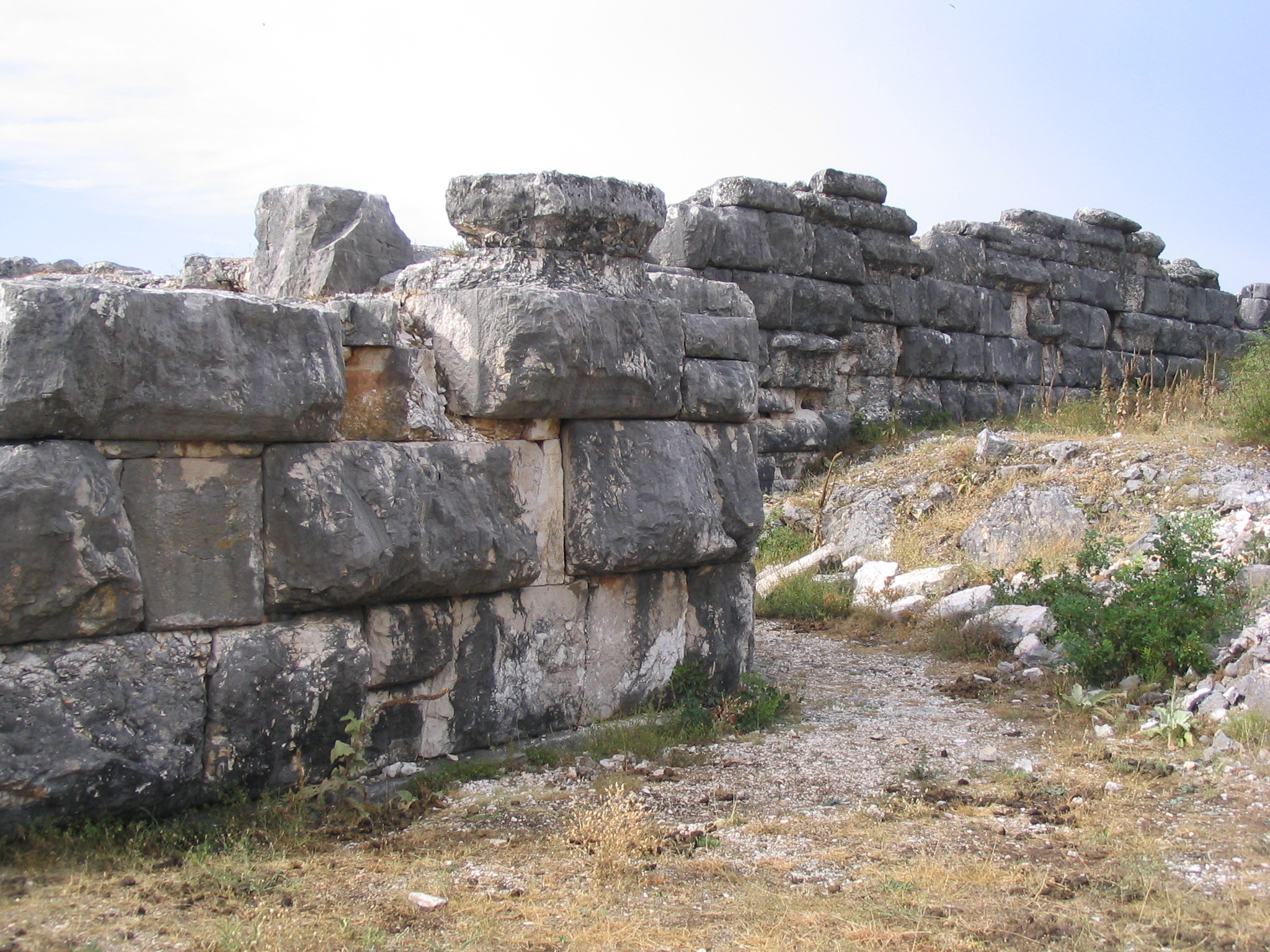
Megalithic walls at Daorson, Bosnia, c. 4th century BC

== Genetic history ==
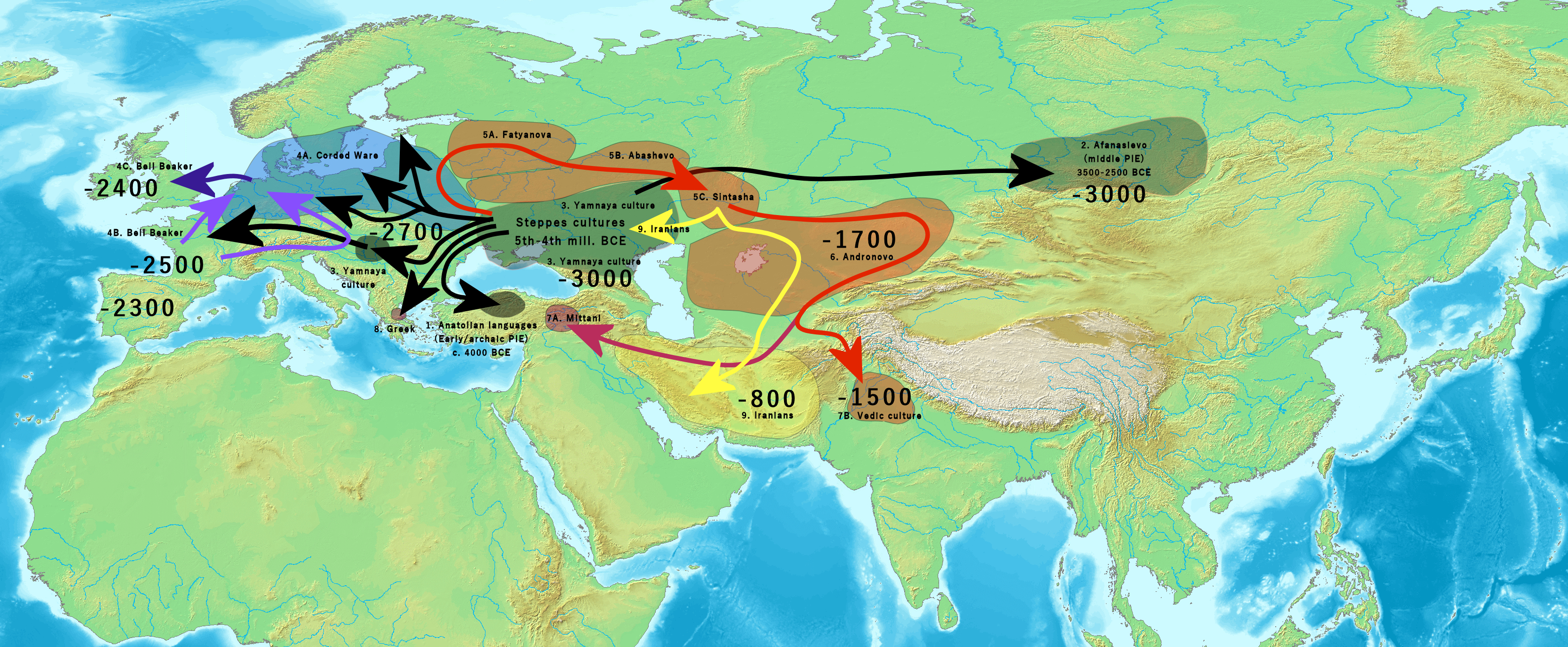
Indo-European migrations spread Yamnaya Steppe pastoralist ancestry and Indo-European languages across large parts of Eurasia.

The genetic history of Europe has been inferred by observing the patterns of genetic diversity across the continent and in the surrounding areas. Use has been made of both classical genetics and molecular genetics. Analysis of the DNA of the modern population of Europe has mainly been used but use has also been made of ancient DNA.

This analysis has shown that modern man entered Europe from the Near East before the Last Glacial Maximum but retreated to refuges in southern Europe in this cold period. Subsequently, people spread out over the whole continent, with subsequent limited migration from the Near East and Asia.

According to a study in 2017, the early farmers belonged predominantly to the paternal Haplogroup G-M201. The maternal haplogroup N1a was also frequent in the farmers.

Evidence from genome analysis of ancient human remains suggests that the modern native populations of Europe largely descend from three distinct lineages: Mesolithic hunter-gatherers, derivative of the Cro-Magnon population of Europe, Early European Farmers (EEF) introduced to Europe during the Neolithic Revolution, and Ancient North Eurasians which expanded to Europe in the context of the Indo-European expansion. The Early European Farmers migrated from Anatolia to the Balkans in large numbers during the 7th millennium BC. During the Chalcolithic and early Bronze Age, the EEF-derived cultures of Europe were overwhelmed by successive invasions of Western Steppe Herders (WSHs) from the Pontic–Caspian steppe, who carried about 60% Eastern Hunter-Gatherer (EHG) and 40% Caucasus Hunter-Gatherer (CHG) admixture. These invasions led to EEF paternal DNA lineages in Europe being almost entirely replaced with EHG/WSH paternal DNA (mainly R1b and R1a). EEF maternal DNA (mainly haplogroup N) also declined, being supplanted by steppe lineages, suggesting the migrations involved both males and females from the steppe. EEF mtDNA, however, remained frequent, suggesting admixture between WSH males and EEF females.

A 2025 study conducted by scientists from the University of Ferrara had found that many of the prehistoric Europeans, including genetic remains from the Stonehenge inhabitants, retained dark skin of their African ancestors until the Bronze and Iron Ages. The analysis suggested that lighter skin had evolved in Europe more sporadically than conventionally believed in academic scholarship. The study had analysed 348 samples pooled from human remains across the British Isles, mainland Europe, Russia, Central Asia, and the Middle East with a chronological range extending from 45,000 to 1,700 years ago.

== Linguistic history ==
The written linguistic record in Europe first begins with the Mycenaean record of early Greek in the Late Bronze Age. Unattested languages spoken in Europe in the Bronze and Iron Ages are the object of reconstruction in historical linguistics, in the case of Europe predominantly Indo-European linguistics.

Indo-European is assumed to have spread from the Pontic steppe at the very beginning of the Bronze Age, reaching Western Europe contemporary with the Beaker culture, after about 5,000 years ago.

Various pre-Indo-European substrates have been postulated, but remain speculative; the "Pelasgian" and "Tyrsenian" substrates of the Mediterranean world, an "Old European" (which may itself have been an early form of Indo-European), a "Vasconic" substrate ancestral to the modern Basque language, or a more widespread presence of early Finno-Ugric languages in northern Europe. An early presence of Indo-European throughout Europe has also been suggested ("Paleolithic continuity theory").

Donald Ringe emphasizes the "great linguistic diversity" which would generally have been predominant in any area inhabited by small-scale, tribal pre-state societies.

== See also ==
- Atlantic Europe
- European megalithic culture
- Mediterranean Europe
- Prehistoric Britain
- Prehistoric Cyprus
- Prehistoric France
- Prehistoric Georgia
- Prehistoric Hungary
- Prehistoric Iberia
- Prehistoric Ireland
- Prehistoric Italy
- Prehistoric Romania
- Prehistoric Scotland
- Prehistoric Transylvania
- Prehistory of Brittany
- Prehistory of Poland (until 966)

== Sources ==
- Achilli, Alessandro; Rengo, Chaira; Magri, Chiara; Battaglia, Vincenza; Olivieri, Anna; Scozari, Rosaria; Cruciani, Fulvio; Zeviani, Massimo; Briem, Egill; Carelli, Valerio; Moral, Pedro; Dugoujon, Jean-Michel; Roostalu, Urmas; Loogväli, Eva-Liss; Kivisild, Toomas; Bandelt, Hans-Jürgen; Richards, Martin; Villems, Richard; Santachiara-Benerecetti, A. Silvana; Semino, Ornella; Torroni, Antonio (2004). "The Molecular Dissection of mtDNA Haplogroup H Confirms that the Franco-Cantabrian Glacial Refuge was a Major Source for the European Gene Pool". American Journal of Human Genetics. 75 (5): 910–918. doi:10.1086/425590. PMC 1182122. PMID 15382008.
- Adams, Jonathan; Otte, Marcel (1999). "Did Indo-European Languages Spread Before Farming?". Current Anthropology. 40 (1): 73–77. doi:10.1086/515804. S2CID 143134729.
- Childe, V. Gordon. 1925. The Dawn of European Civilization. New York: Knopf.
- Childe V.Gordon. 1950. Prehistoric Migrations in Europe. Oslo: Aschehoug.
- Cavalli-Sforza L.L., Paolo Menozzi, Alberto Piazza. 1994. The History and Geography of Human Genes. Princeton: Princeton University Press.
- Finnilä, Saara; Lehtonen, Mervi S.; Majamaa, Kari (2001). "Phylogenetic Network for European mtDNA". American Journal of Human Genetics. 68 (6): 1475–1484. doi:10.1086/320591. PMC 1226134. PMID 11349229.
- Gimbutas, M (1980). "The Kurgan wave migration (c. 3400–3200 B.C.) into Europe and the following transformation of culture". Journal of Near Eastern Studies. 8: 273–315.
- Macaulay, Vincent; Richards, Martin; Hickey, Eileen; Vega, Emilce; Cruciani, Fulvio; Guida, Valentina; Scozzari, Rosaria; Bonné-Tamir, Batsheva; Sykes, Bryan; Torroni, Antonio (1999). "The Emerging Tree of West Eurasian mtDNAs: A Synthesis of Control-Region Sequences and RFLPs". American Journal of Human Genetics. 64 (1): 232–249. doi:10.1086/302204. PMC 1377722. PMID 9915963.
- Metspalu, Mait, Toomas Kivisild, Ene Metspalu, Jüri Parik, Georgi Hudjashov, Katrin Kaldma, Piia Serk, Monika Karmin, Doron M Behar, M Thomas P Gilbert, Phillip Endicott, Sarabjit Mastana, Surinder S Papiha, Karl Skorecki, Antonio Torroni and Richard Villems. 2004. "Most of the extant mtDNA boundaries in South and Southwest Asia were likely shaped during the initial settlement of Eurasia by anatomically modern humans." BMC Genetics 5
- Piccolo, Salvatore. 2013. Ancient Stones: The Prehistoric Dolmens of Sicily. Abingdon (GB): Brazen Head Publishing.
- Renfrew, Colin. 2001. "The Anatolian origins of Proto-Indo-European and the autochthony of the Hittites." In Greater Anatolia and the Indo-Hittite Language Family, R. Drews ed., pp. 36–63. Washington, DC: Institute for the Study of Man.
- Venemann, Theo. 2003. Europa Vasconica, Europa Semitica. Trends in Linguistic Studies and Monographs No. 138. New York and Berlin: Mouton de Gruyter.
- Wiik, Kalevi. 2002. Europpalaisten Juuret. Athens: Juvaskylä
