= La Olmeda =

Roman Villa (1st to 5th Centuries AD)

Coordinates: 42°28′54″N 4°44′11″W

Floor plan of the Roman villa of the 4th century AD of La Olmeda in Pedrosa de la Vega (Palencia, Castile and León).

The palatial Late Antique Roman villa at La Olmeda is situated in Pedrosa de la Vega in the province of Palencia (Castile and León, Spain), near the banks of the Carrión. Long known as the provenance of chance finds, it was finally professionally excavated from 1968, and was declared a Bien de Interés Cultural, 3 April 1996.

The site was donated in 1984 to the Diputación de Palencia by its proprietor and discoverer, Javier Cortes Álvarez de Miranda, who had supported the archaeological investigation of the site from 1969 to 1980. It is open to the public, while a museum dedicated to the finds is housed in the nearby church of San Pedro de Saldaña.

The agrarian villa was developed in several stages, from the first to the third century AD, with major reconstruction in the fourth century and extending in use at least to the end of the fifth. The villa complex centers on the elite quarters of rigorously symmetrical disposition, wherein twenty-seven rooms, twelve with mosaic floors, are disposed around a central patio crossed with mosaic paths in geometric patterns and linked round its perimeter by a wide peristyle. This main building housed the poentior, with its oecus or reception hall, centered in the east wing featuring a particularly resplendent mosaic floor. Slightly raised semicircular apses mark its northeastern and northwestern end rooms. The main body of the villa communicated with a baths by a grand passageway. The principal front of the main block faces south, with a porticoed gallery ending in octagonal tower blocks. The residential quarters face north with two rectangular corner towers.

The complex also included working and living quarters of more rustic aspect, kilns for baking roof tiles on the site, three burial grounds, and a section of paved roadway.

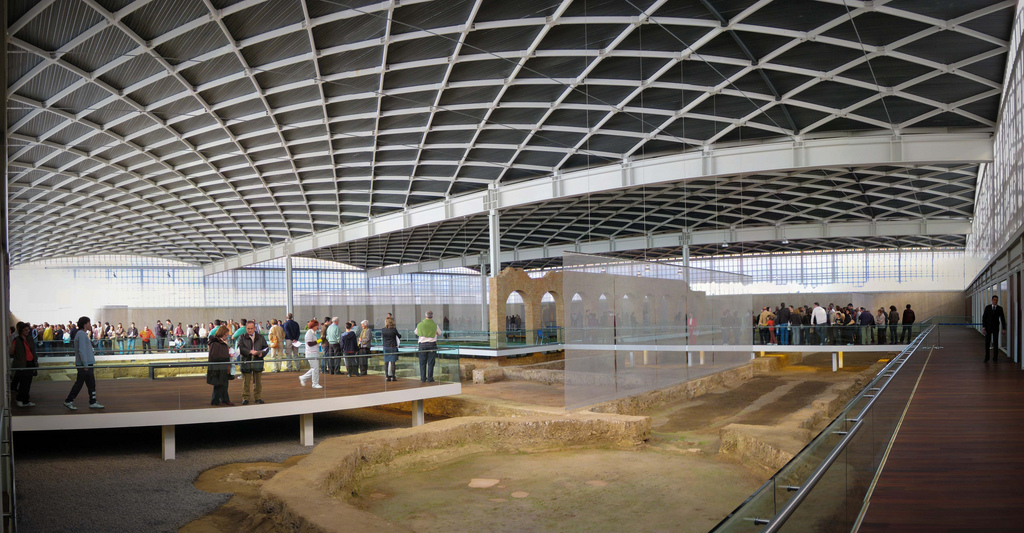
The protective housing, designed by Ángela García de Paredes and Ignacio García-Pedrosa

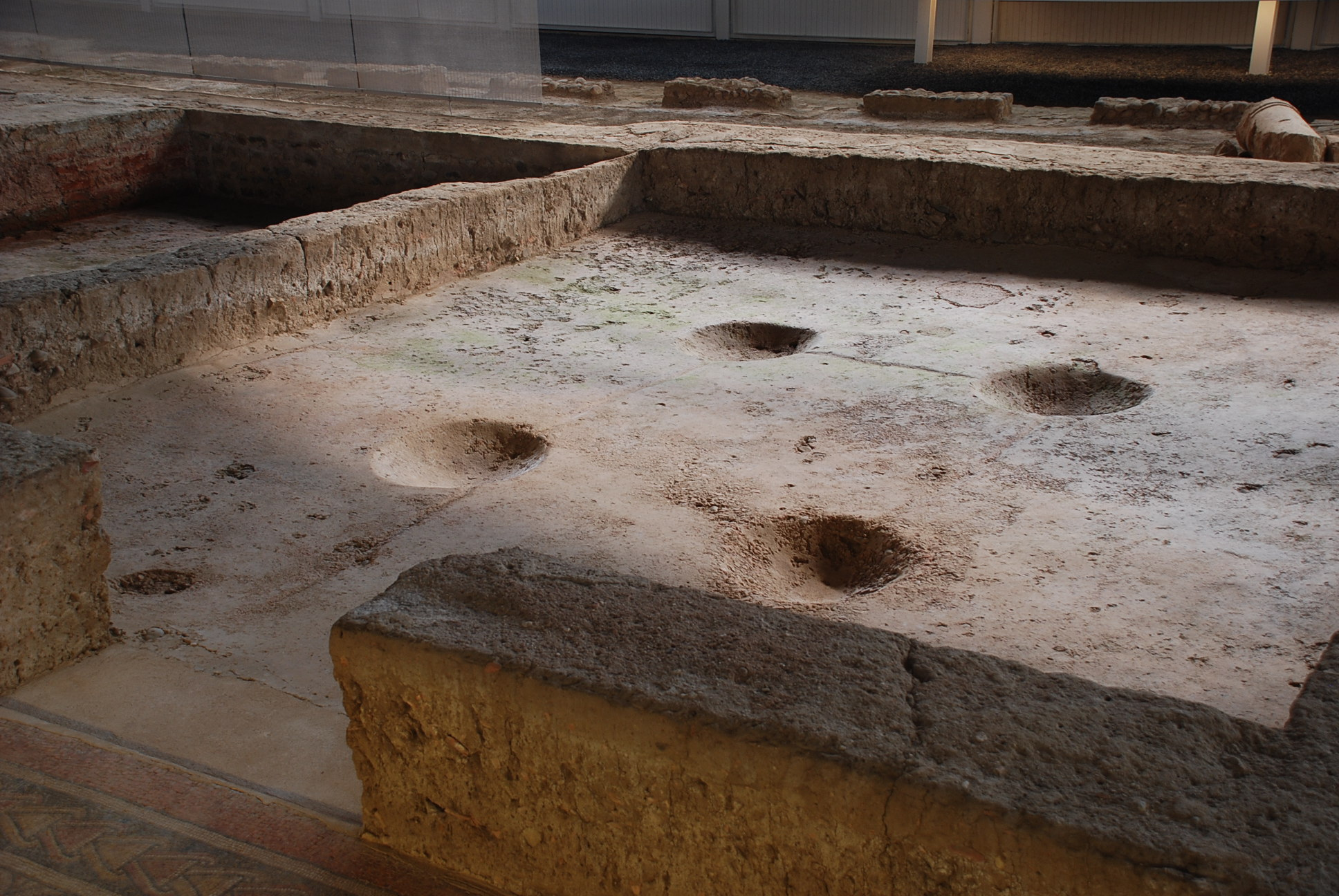
Storing area at Roman villae of La Olmeda

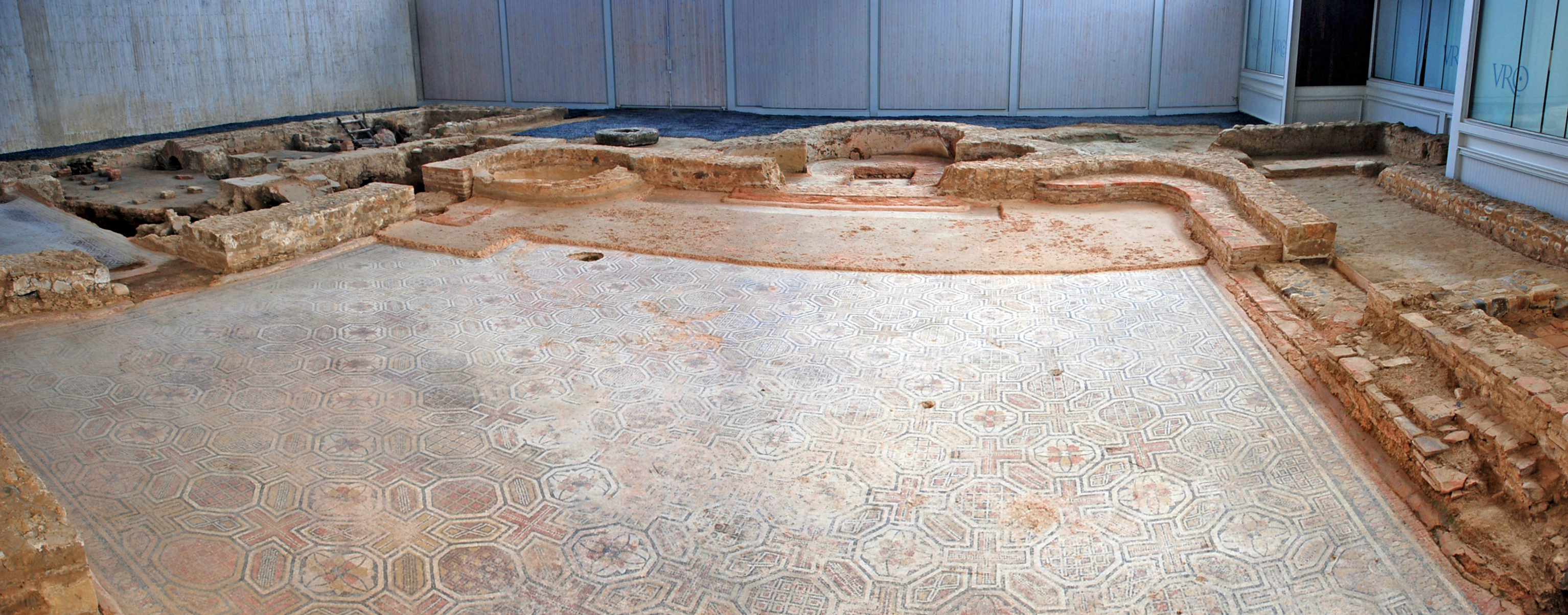
Thermae at La Olmeda

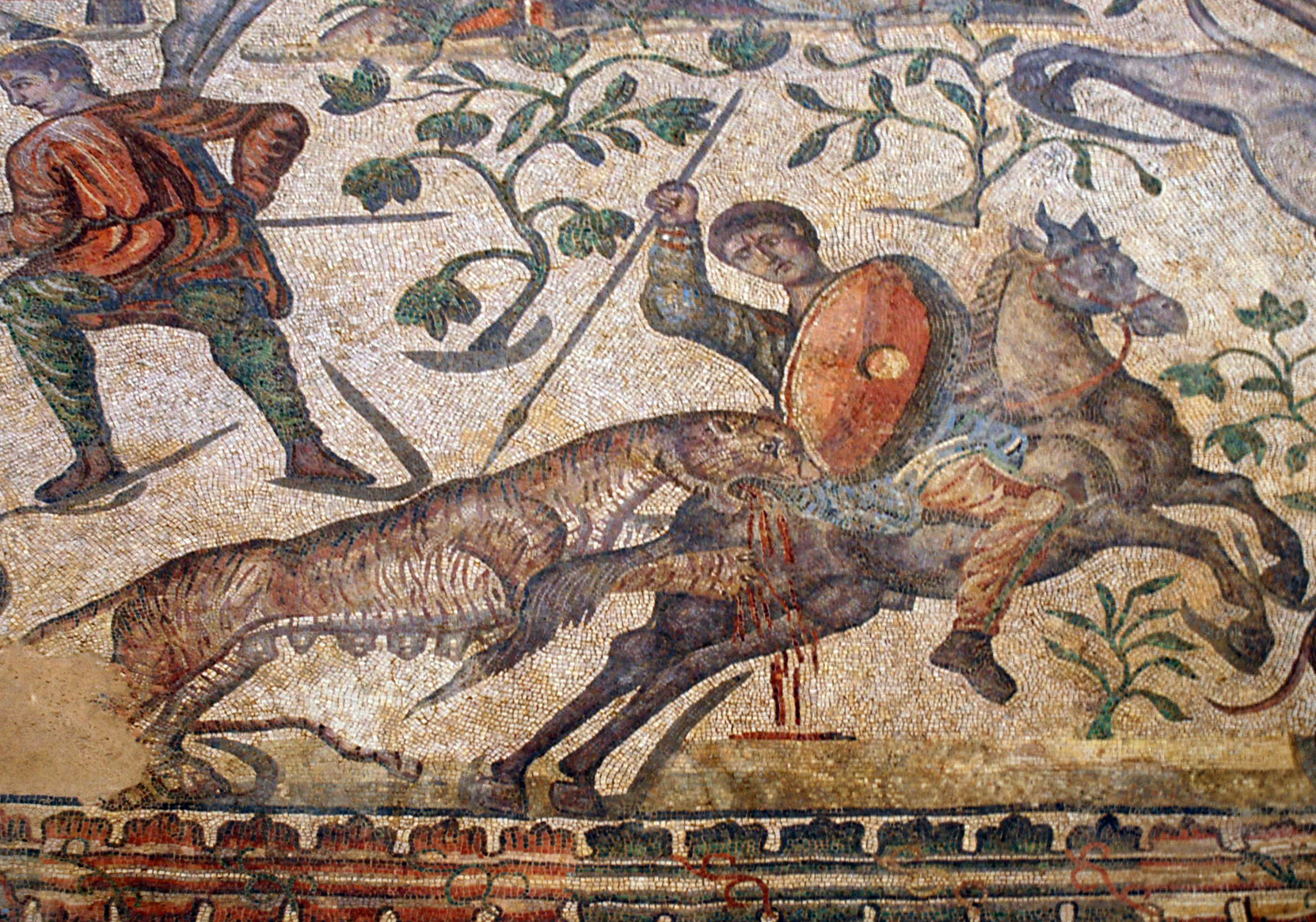
The hunt mosaic from La Olmeda

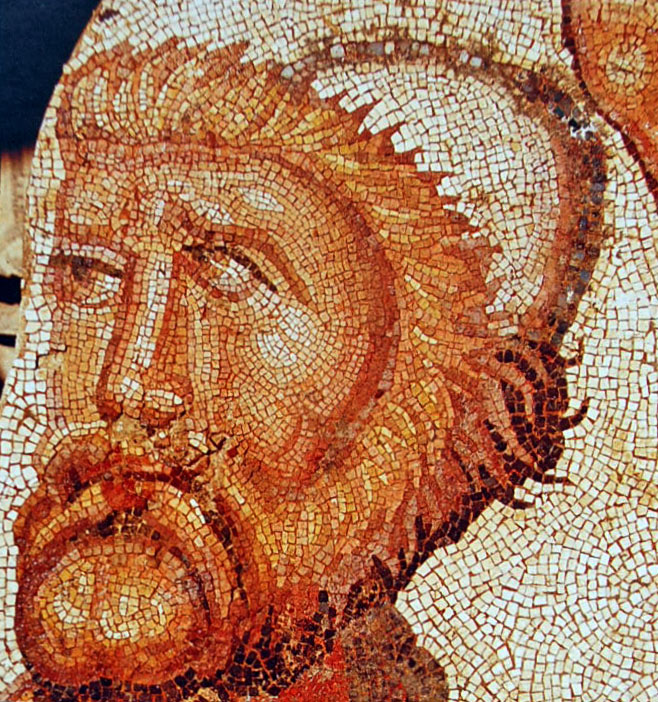
Mosaic depicting Odysseus

== See also ==
- Fuentes Tamáricas
