= Teatro Valle-Inclán =

Theatre in Madrid, Spain

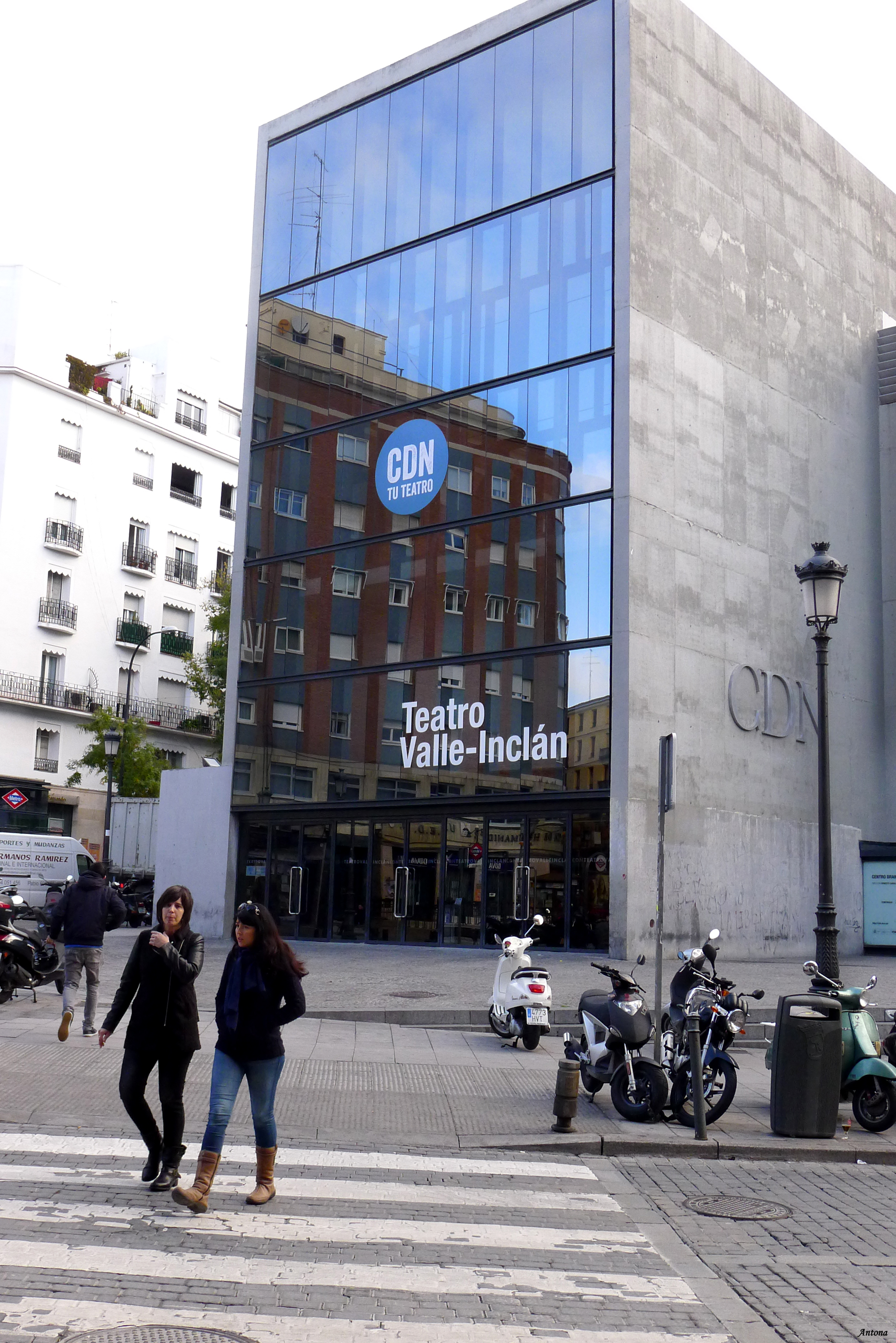
- Interactive map of Teatro Valle-Inclán
- Address: Calle de Valencia 1
- Location: Madrid, Spain
- Coordinates: 40°24′29.53″N 3°42′1.59″W
- Type: Theatre

Construction
- Opened: February 2006
- Architects: Ángela García de Paredes; Ignacio García Pedrosa

The Teatro Valle-Inclán is a theatre in Madrid, Spain. Together with Teatro María Guerrero, it is the home of the Spanish Centro Dramático Nacional. It is located at plaza de Lavapiés, in the city centre, and opened in February 2006.

Architects Ángela García de Paredes and Ignacio García Pedrosa received the 2007 Spanish Architecture Award for its design.
