= Museum of Almería =

- Museo Arqueológico de Almería
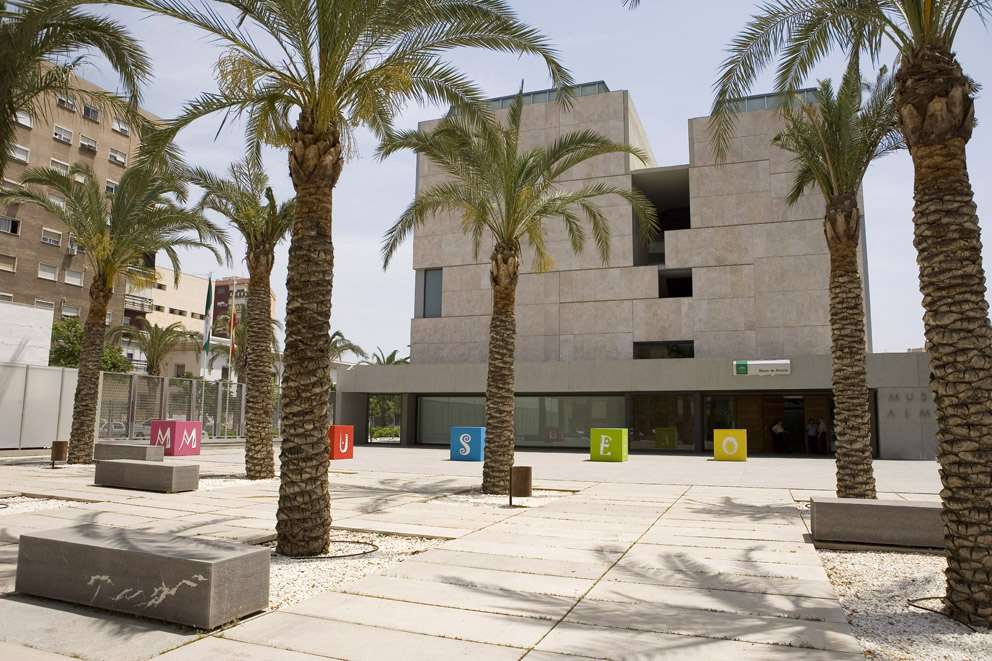

- Location of Museum of Almería in Almería city
- Established: 1934; in present location since 2006
- Location: 91, Carretera de Ronda, 04005; Almería, Andalusia, Spain
- Coordinates: 36.838333°N 2.455417°W
- Type: Archaeological Museum
- Visitors: 55.617 (2012)
- Director: María Isabel Pérez Bernárdez
- Website: www.museosdeandalucia.es/web/museodealmeria/inicio

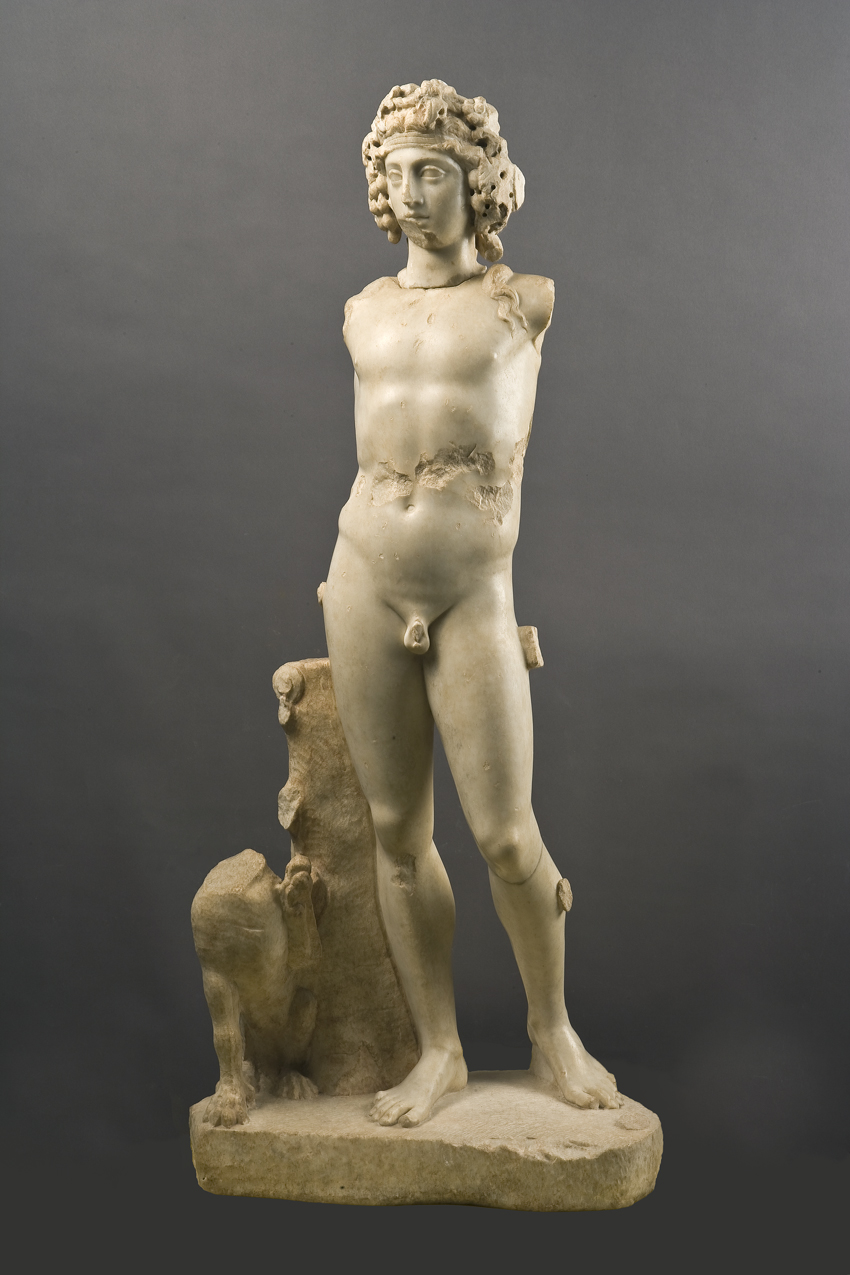
Representation of the god Bacchus. Marble sculpture (Chirivel, Almería, Spain)

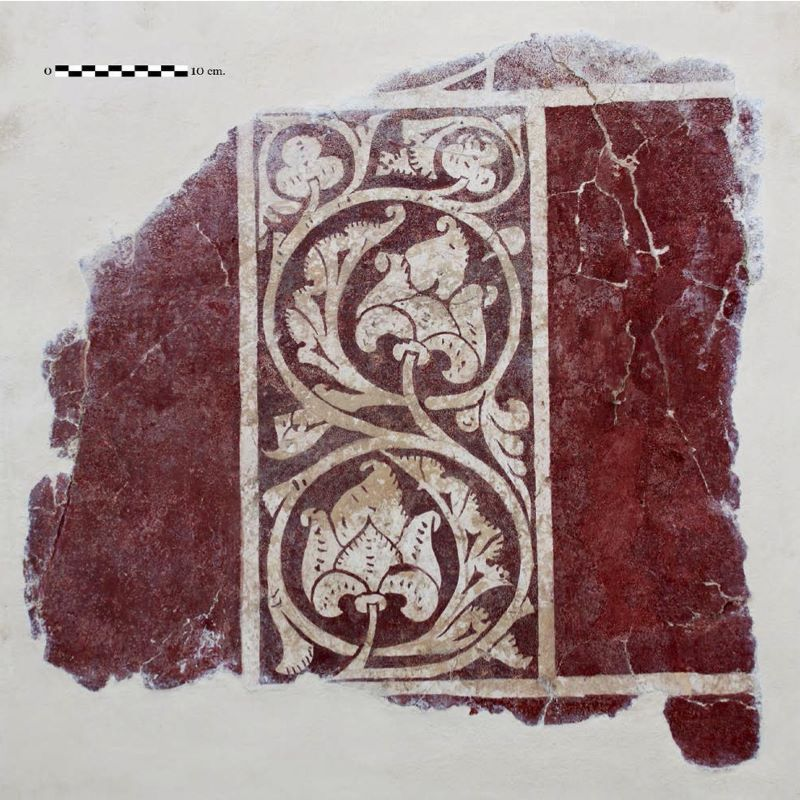
Stucco decorated with floral motifs (Alcazaba of Almeria, 11th century)

The Museum of Almería is an archaeological museum in the Province of Almería. It has been a public institution since 1934, and moved to a new building in 2006.

== History ==
In 1880, the Belgian engineer Luis Siret found Los Millares, a prehistoric site in the region of Almería. During his archaeological research there, he developed a collection of artifacts which he eventually donated to the National Archeological Museum, with the desire that part of the collection stay in Almería. The conditions were agreed upon during the Second Spanish Republic, when the museum was opened. In 1934, the Provincial Archaeological Museum of Almería began in two small rooms ceded by the Escuela de Artes y Oficios, but the collection did not include the substantial part of the Siret duplicates that he had hoped would stay in Almería. In 2006, the museum was moved to its current building.

=== Current museum ===
The new museum has three floors used for exhibitions. A display of a stratigraphic column spans all three floors, rising to the roof of the building. The exhibitions are mainly dedicated to Copper and Bronze Age history.

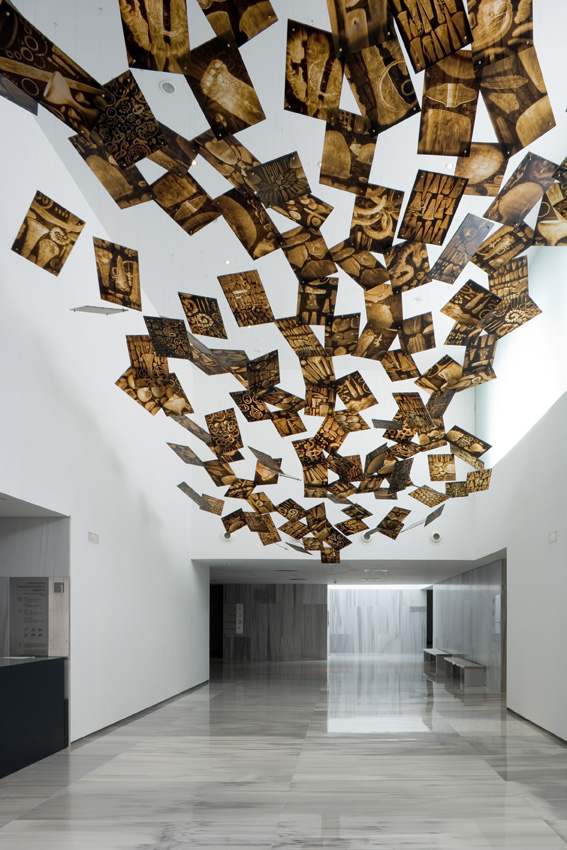
Hall, with "Siret Cloud". Museum of Almería.

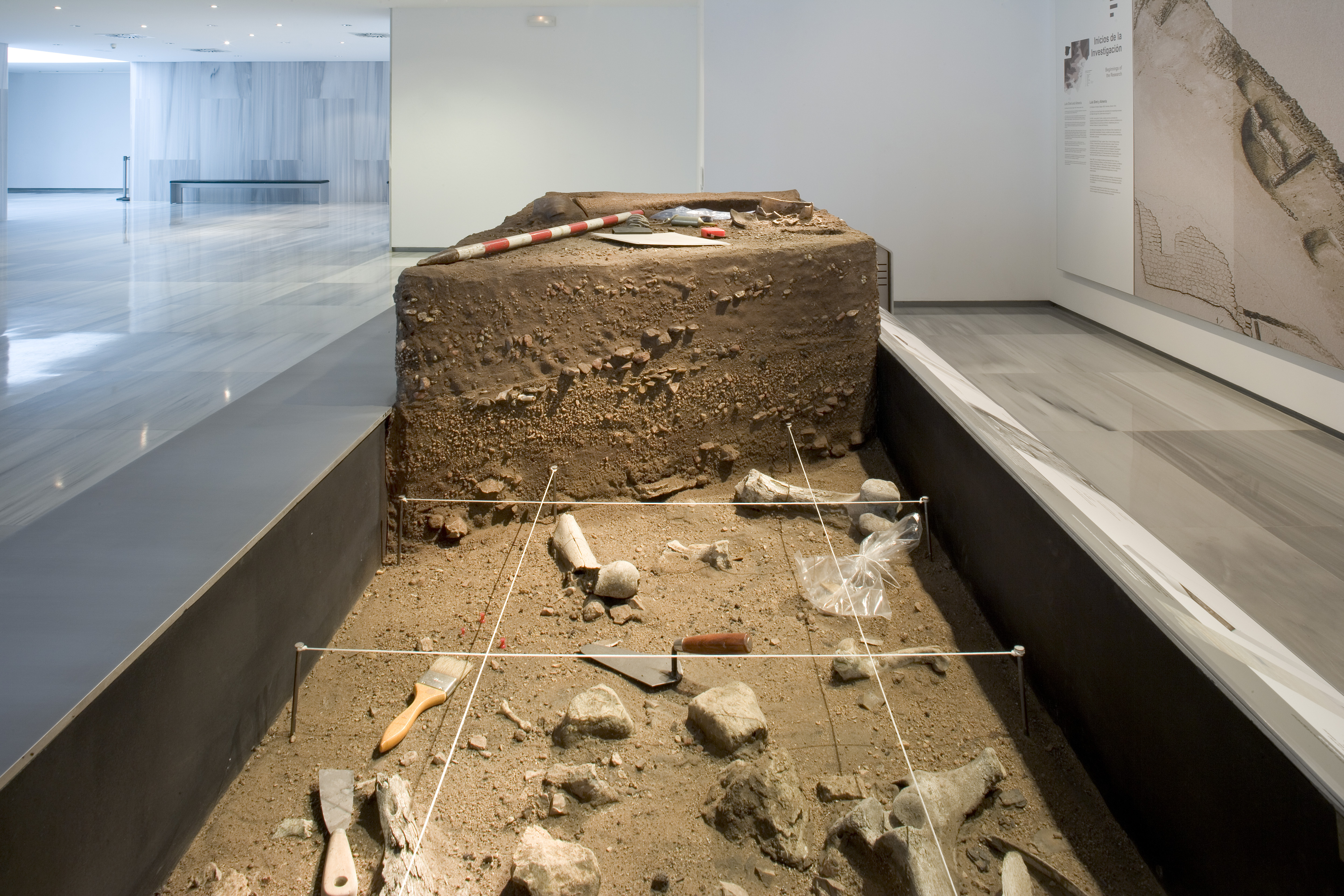
Model on archaeological methodology.

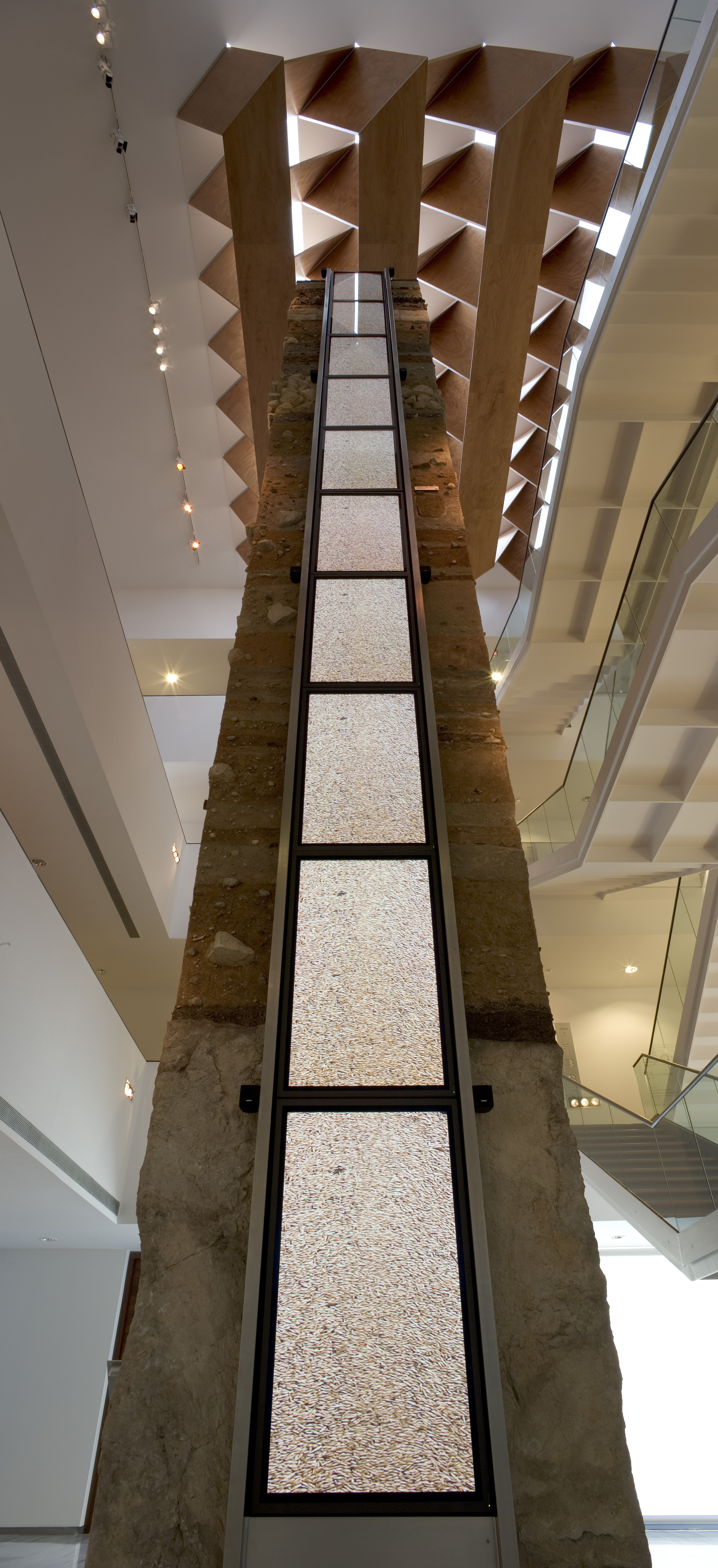
Stratigraphic column.

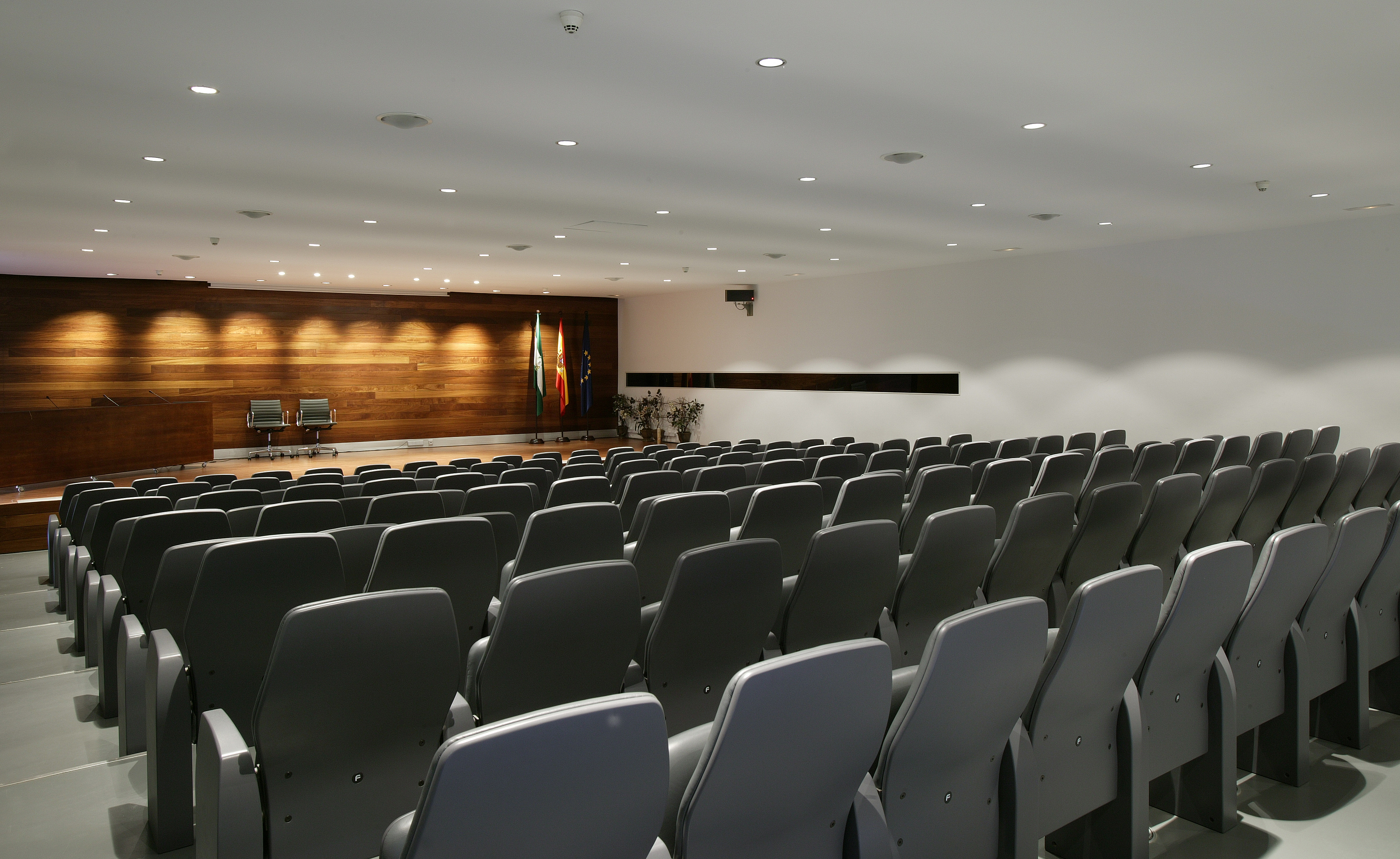
Assembly hall of the Museum of Almería.

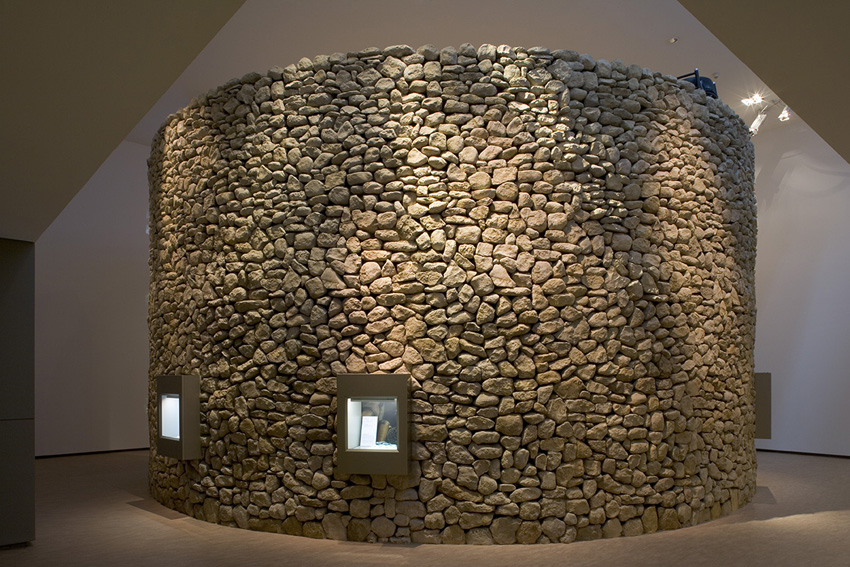
Outside of the "Circle of Life" (Prehistoric Society Los Millares).

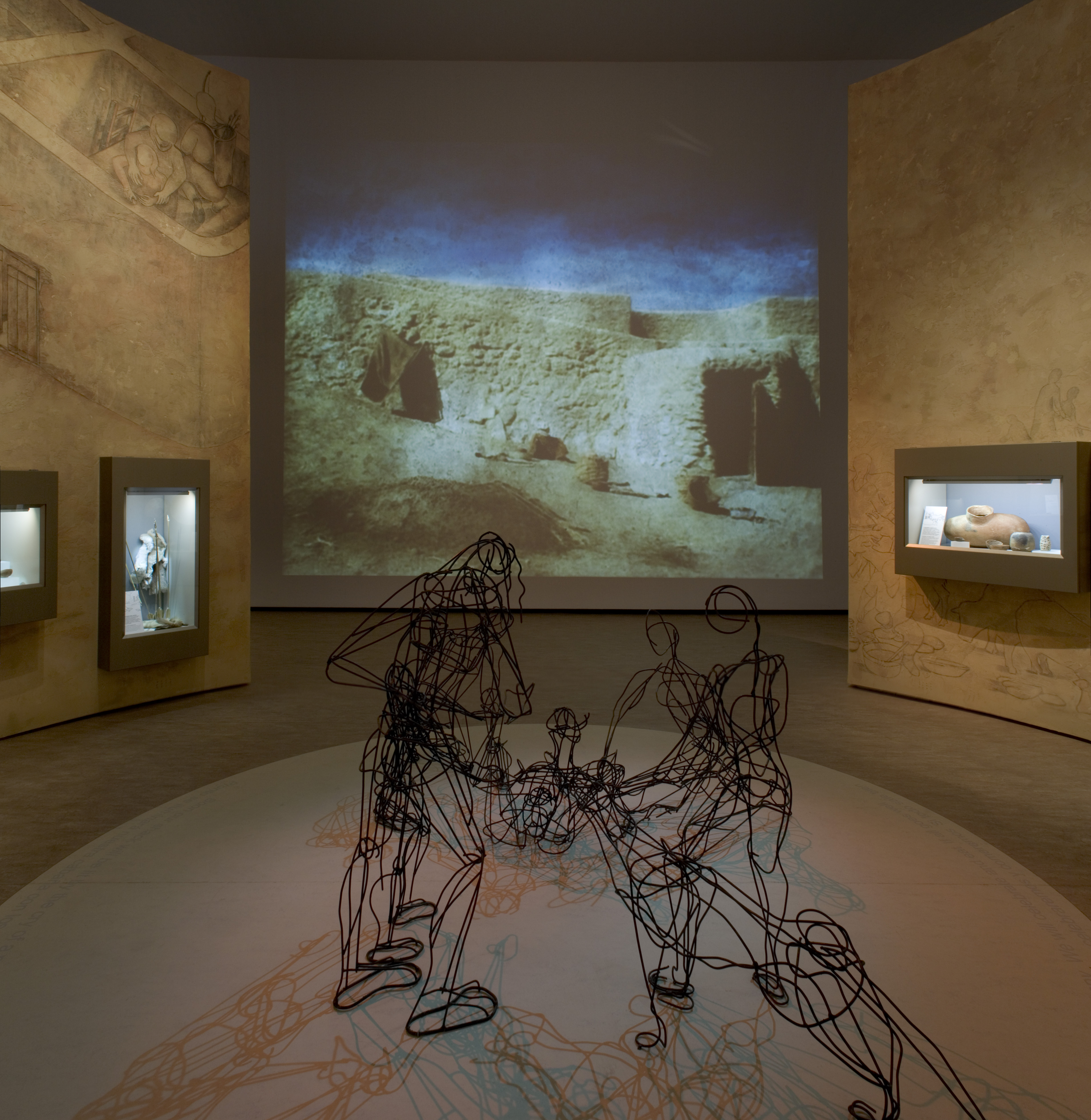
Inside of the "Circle of Life" (Prehistoric Society Los Millares).

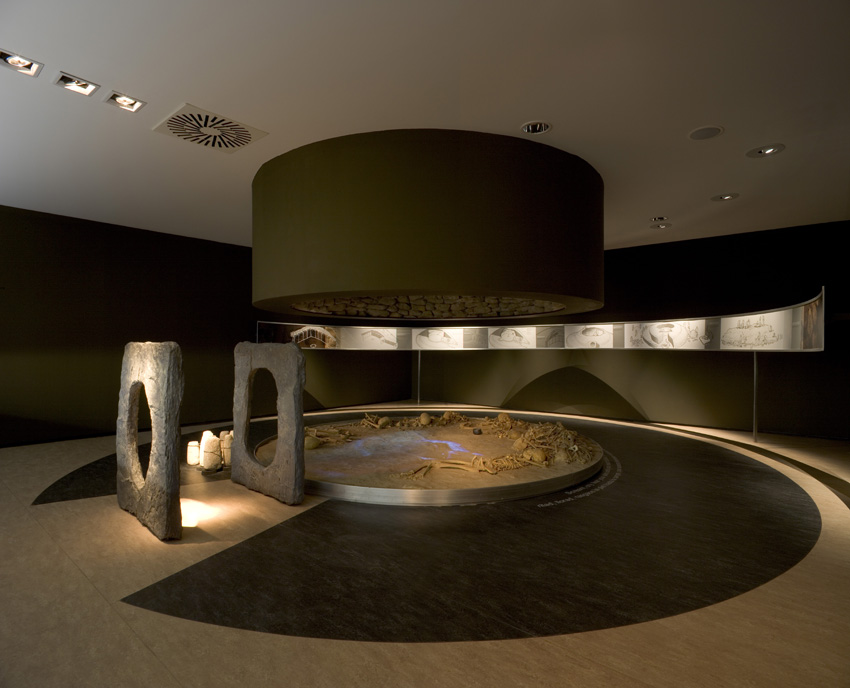
"Circle of Death" (Prehistoric Society Los Millares).

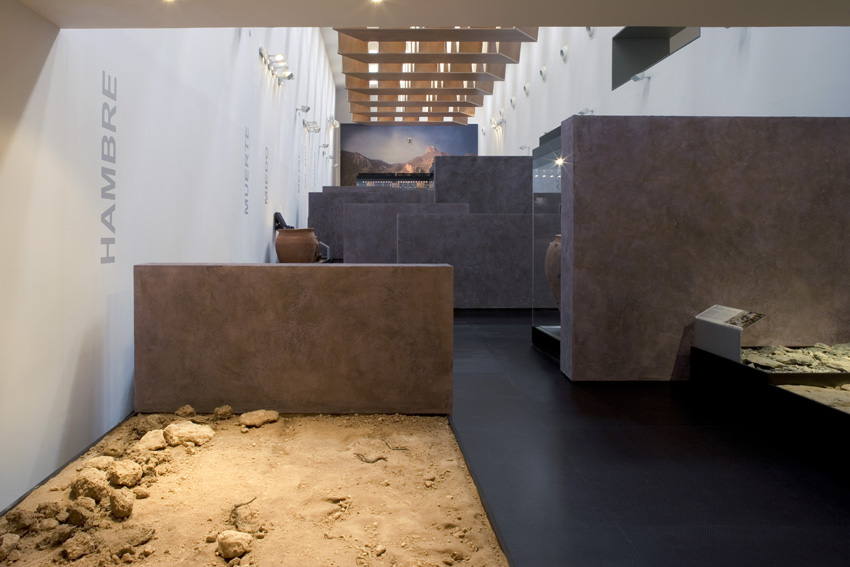
Gallery devoted to prehistoric Society El Argar (2nd Floor).

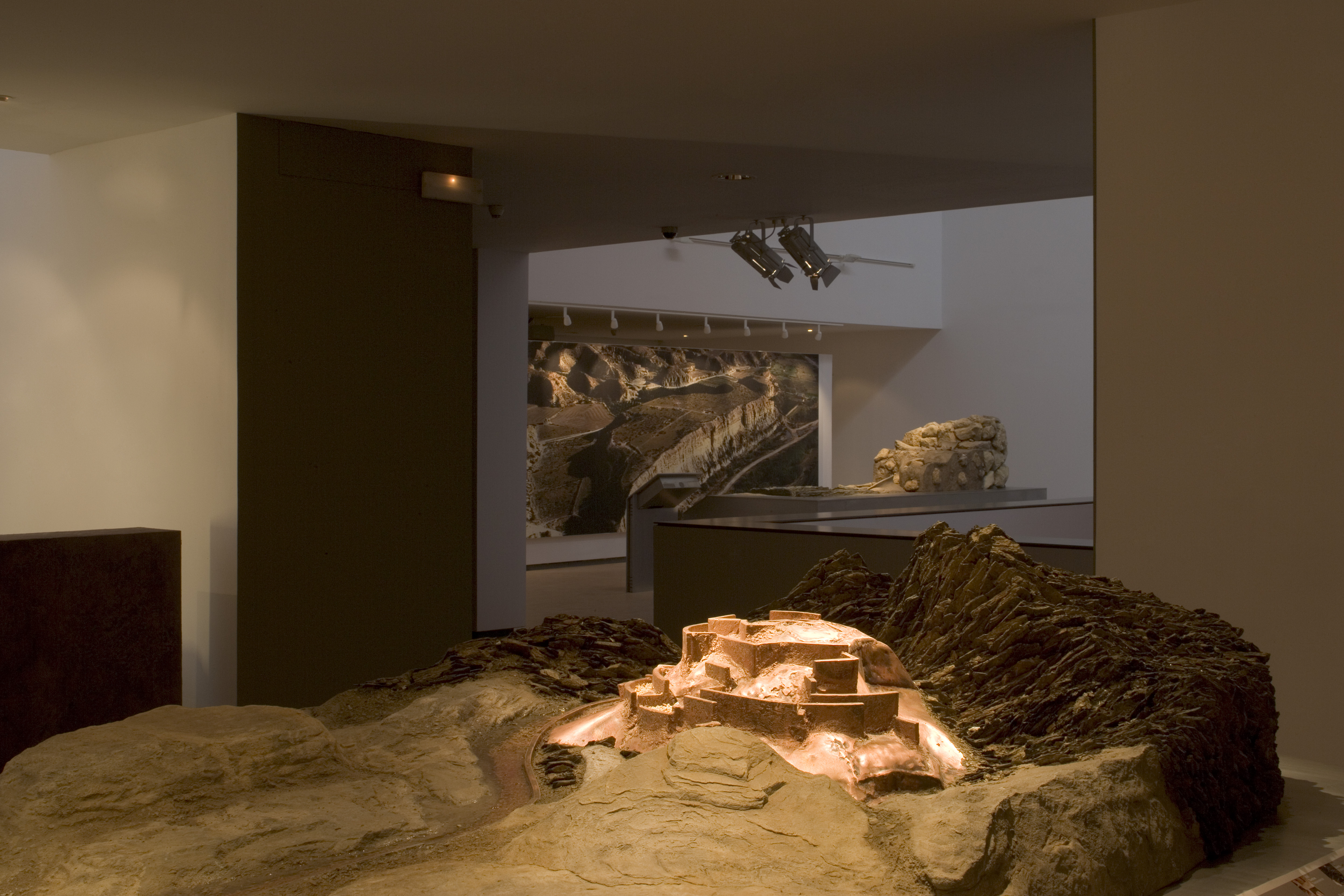
The Model prehistoric Society El Argar.

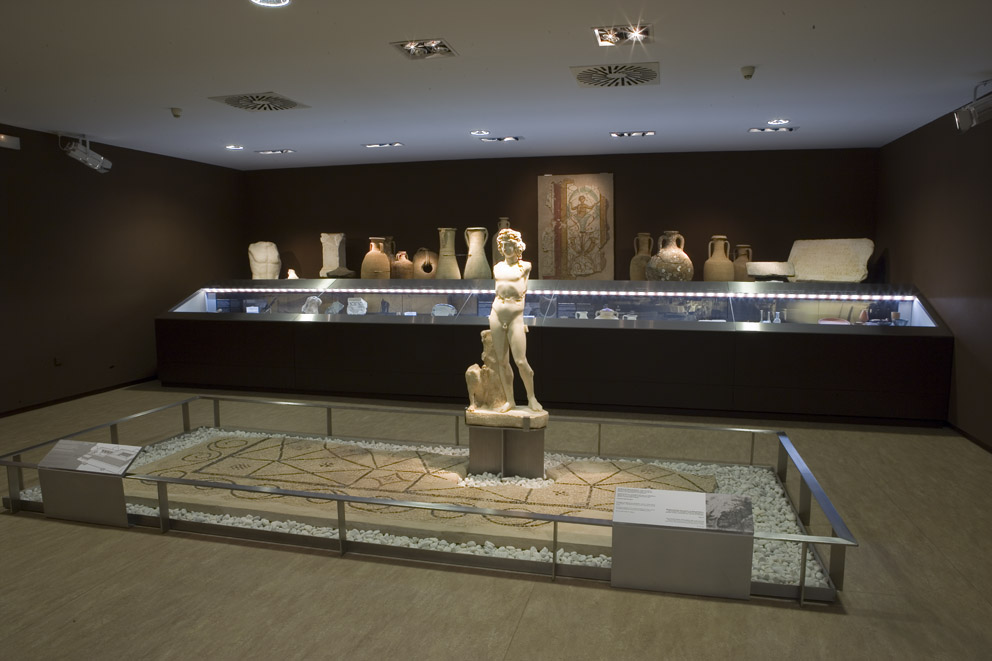
Roman Society in Southeast Hispania (3rd floor).

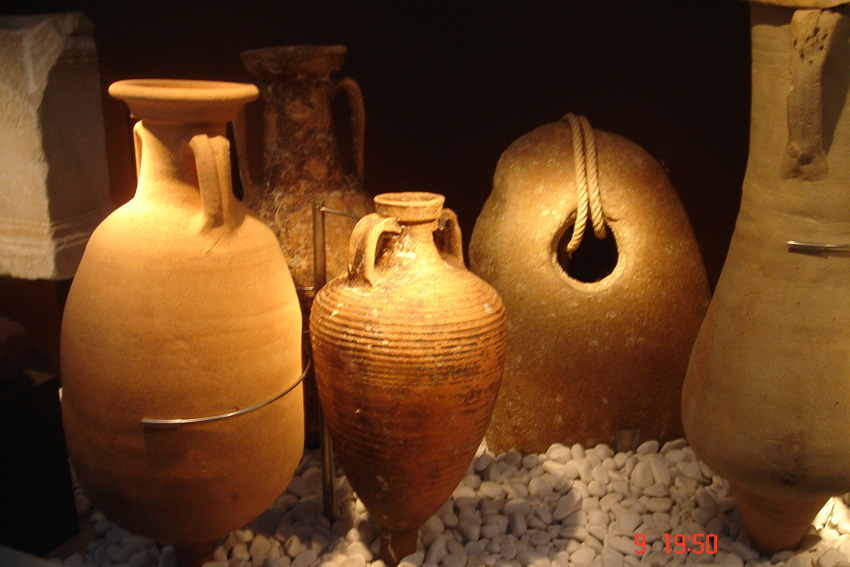
Roman Society in Southeast Hispania. Trade in natural resources.

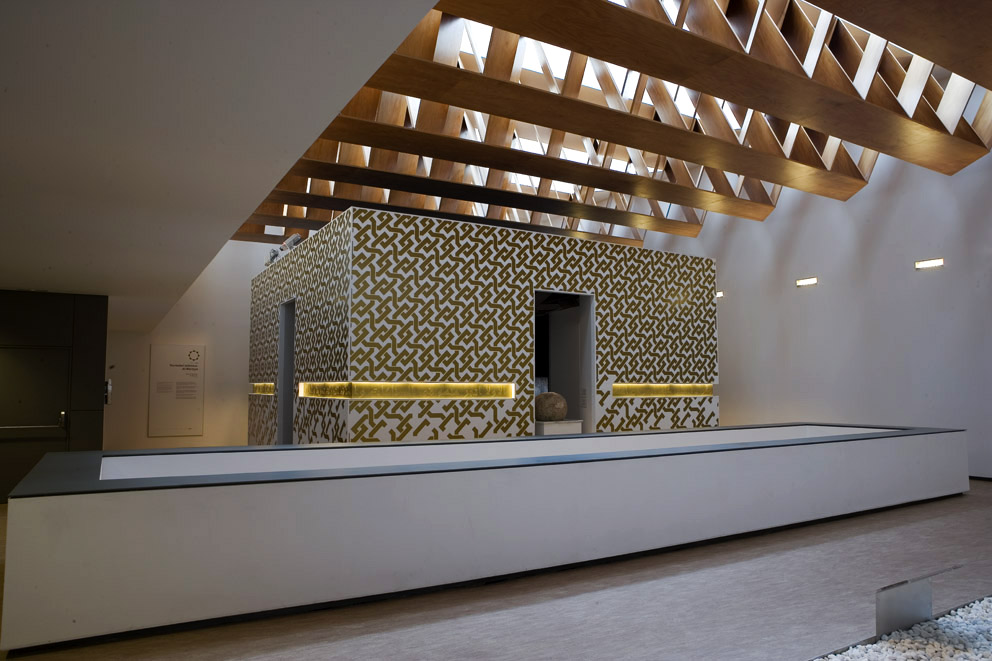
Al-Andalus (3rd floor).

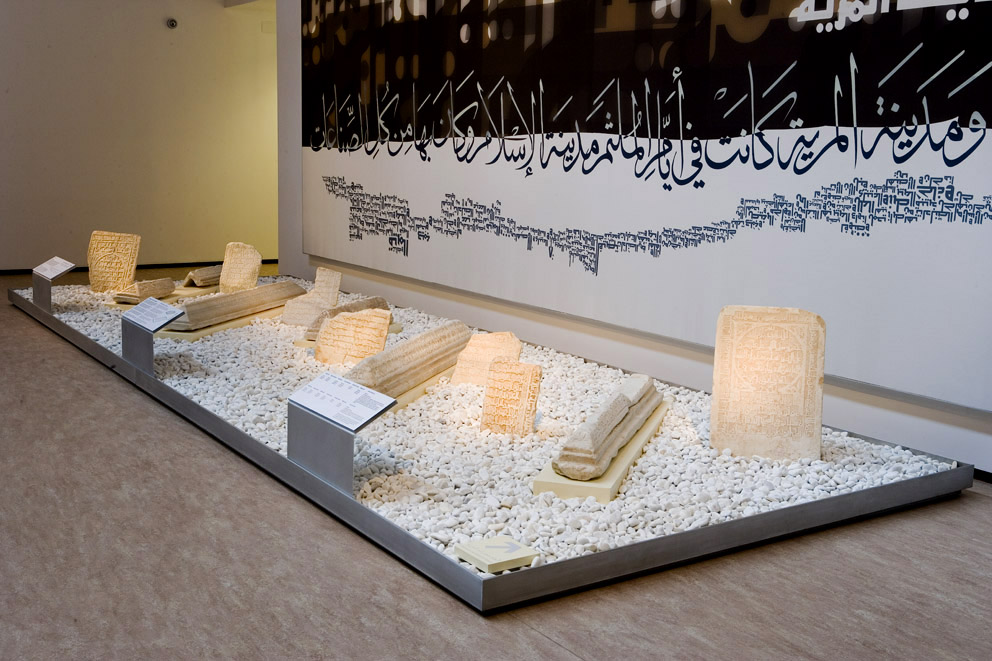
Cemeteries in Al-Andalus (3rd floor).

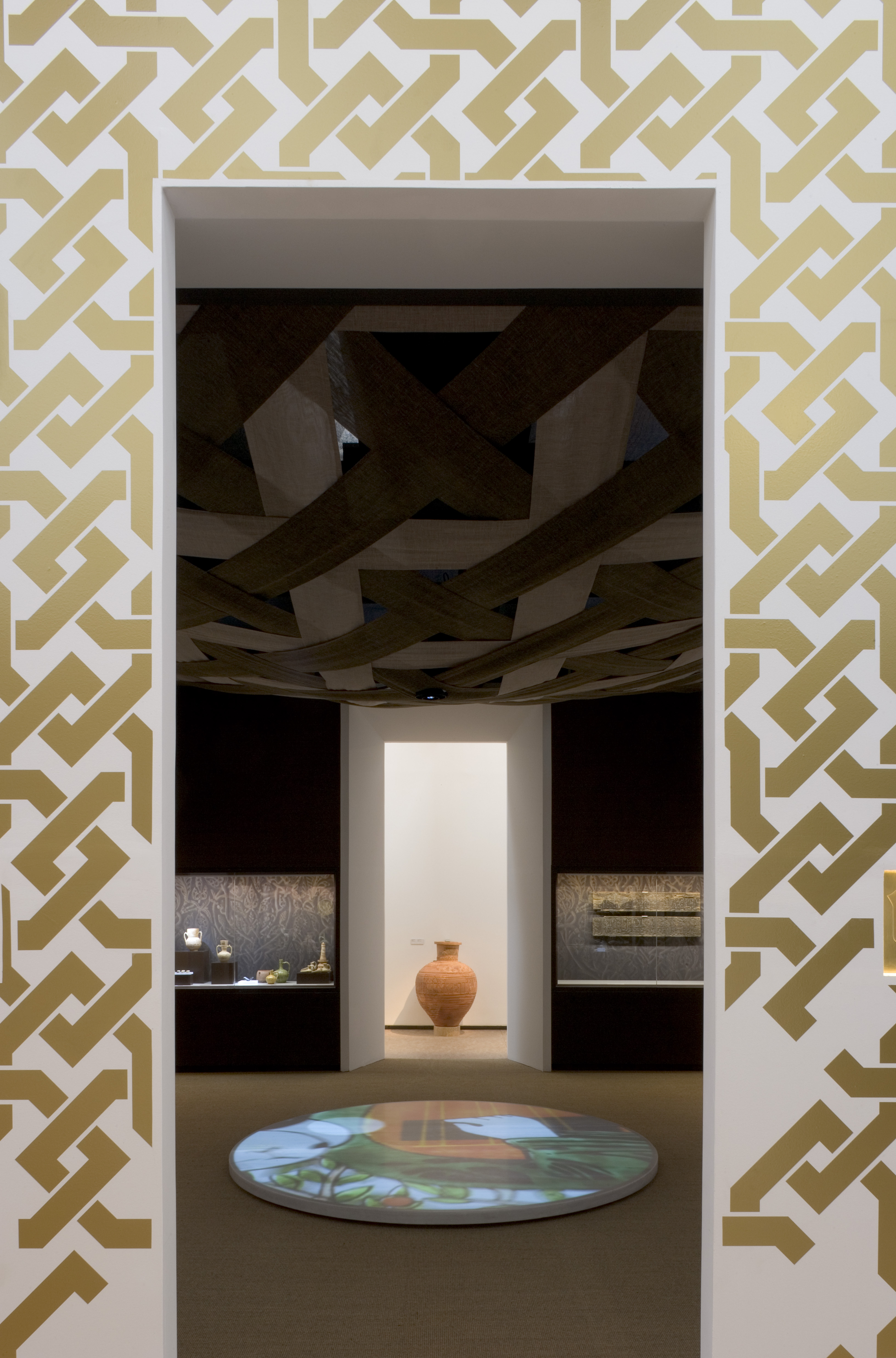
Foundation of Almería (Al-Marilla).

== Collections ==
=== Permanent exhibition ===
The permanent exhibition is located on the first and second floors of the building. The focus is mainly on:

- hunter-gatherer society,
- the society of Los Millares (Santa Fe de Mondújar, Almería)
- the society of the “El Argar” culture centred on Antas, Almería.

On the second floor, there is a metal structure in the middle of the room called the “Circle of Life.” Materials that teach us about the trade and war of the Millares society surround it. There are also objects related to the daily life of the settlement. The “Circle of Death” display, with the support of a video projection, shadows and sound, demonstrates much about the collective use of the graves and the ritual sequence carried out with each new burial. On the second floor is a layout of consecutive walls progressing from the bottom to the top, with the intention of showing how the society lived on the hillsides through their terraced homes and landscapes, especially in Fuente-Álamo, Cuevas del Almanzora, Almería. The area includes small sub-rooms with glass cases containing big vessels, bronze weapons, silver and gold objects and ceramics among other remains.

=== Semi-permanent exhibition ===
On the third floor, there is a long term display of a collection of Roman and Andalusian pieces. This includes a sculpture of the god Bacchus, found in a Roman villa excavated in the town of Chirivel in the northern part of Almería. There is also a collection of Andalusian Muslim tombstones, of which Almería was the leading production center. A display in the center of the room holds cabinets containing ceramics, toys, coins, and other small objects.

=== More in the museum ===
The museum also holds a library which is open to the public. The museum holds an exhibition area on the main floor where painting, contemporary art, and photography are displayed. There is a large space at the front of the museum which can be used by the general public.

== Building ==
In 2006, the museum moved to a new building designed by Ignacio García Pedrosa and Ángela García de Paredes. The building won two awards (PAD and ARCO) in 2004. It was also a finalist in 2005 in the Fostering Arts and Design (FAD) Awards. In 2008, it received an honorable mention by the European Museum of the Year contest.

== Gallery ==
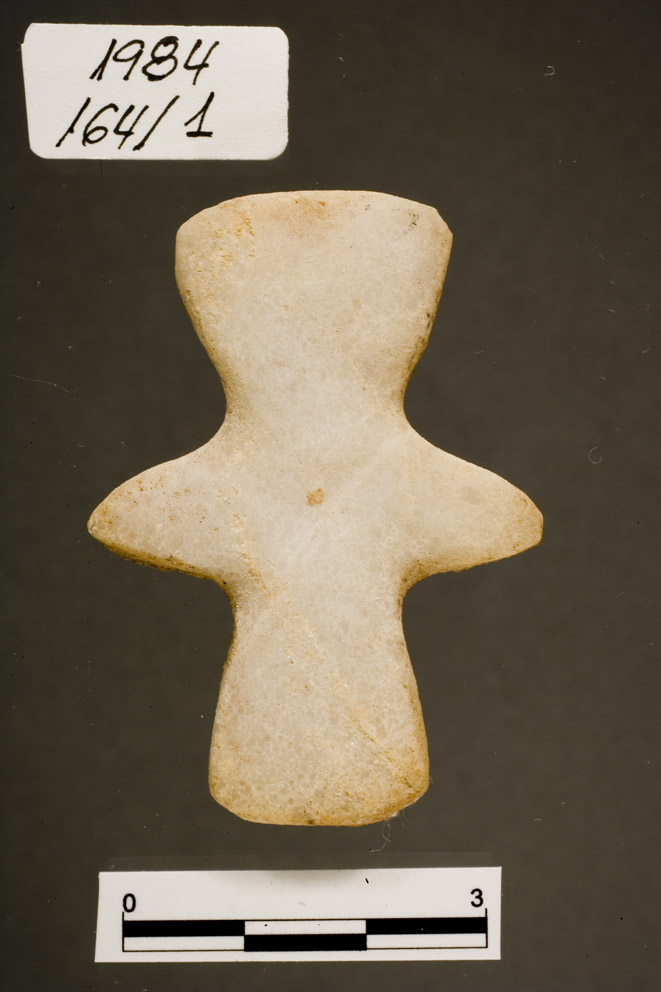
Prehistoric Idol cruciform (Cantoria, Almería, Spain).

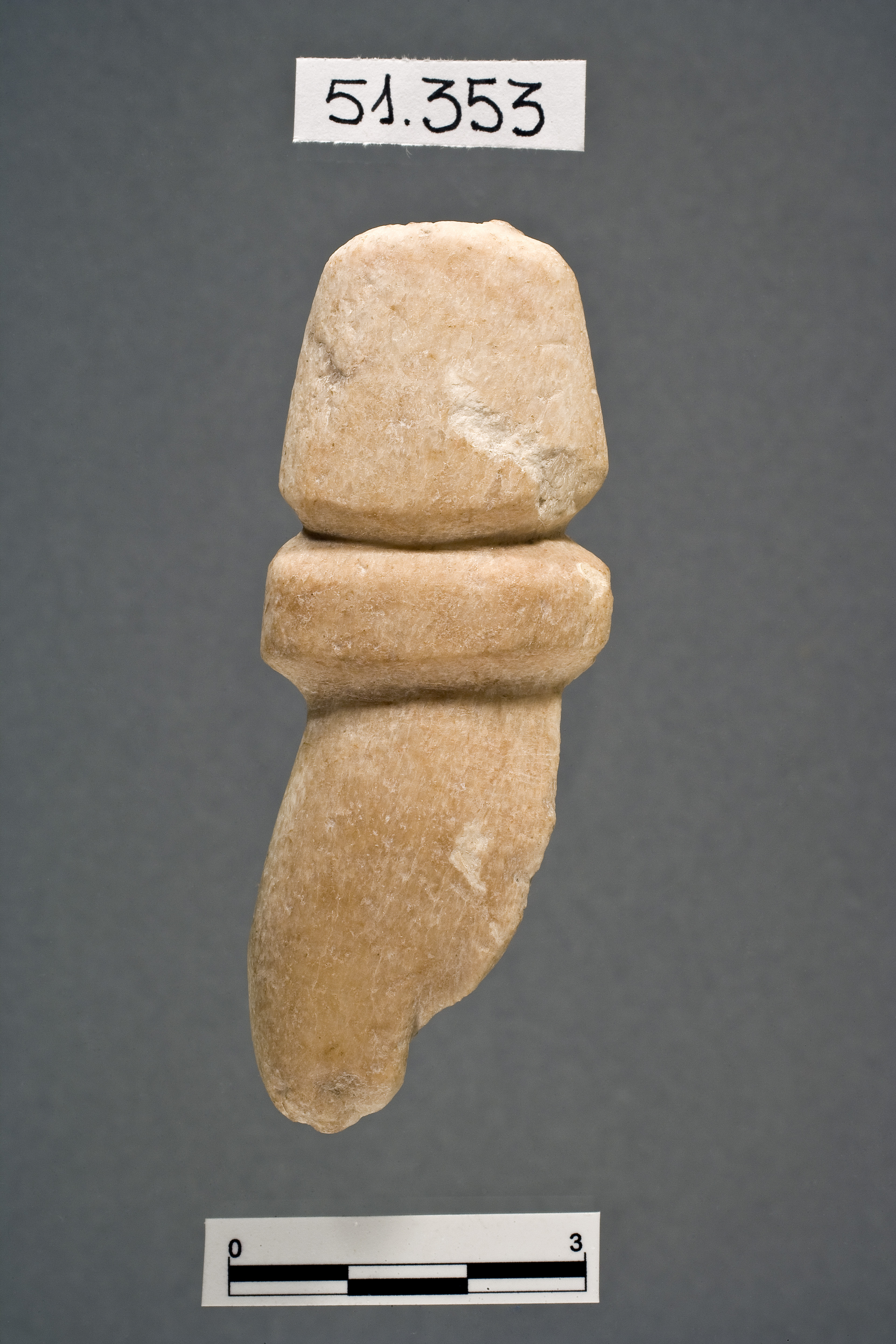
Prehistoric Idol alabaster (Rioja, Almería, Spain).

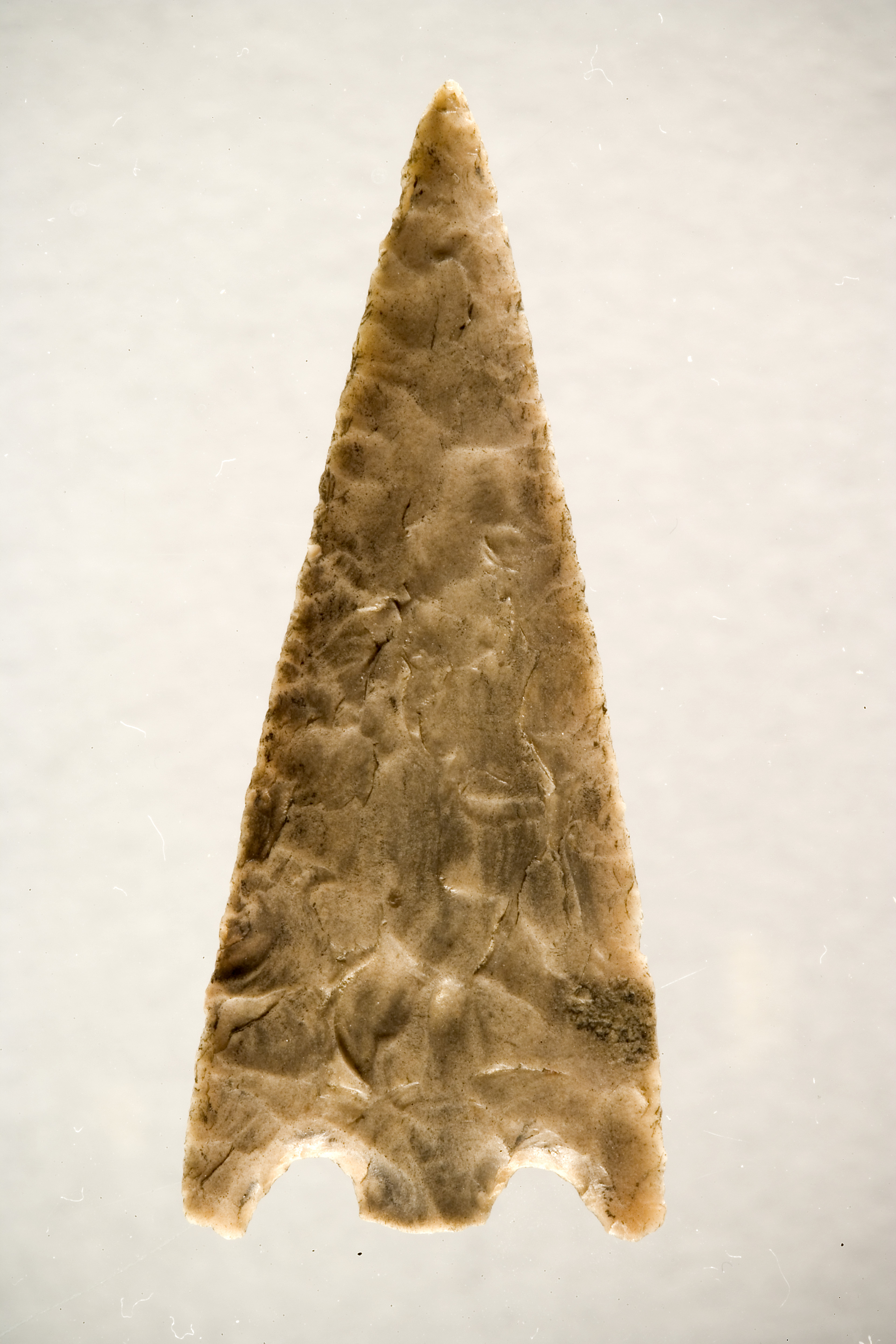
Flint arrowhead (Prehistoric Society of Los Millares. 3200-2250 BCE).

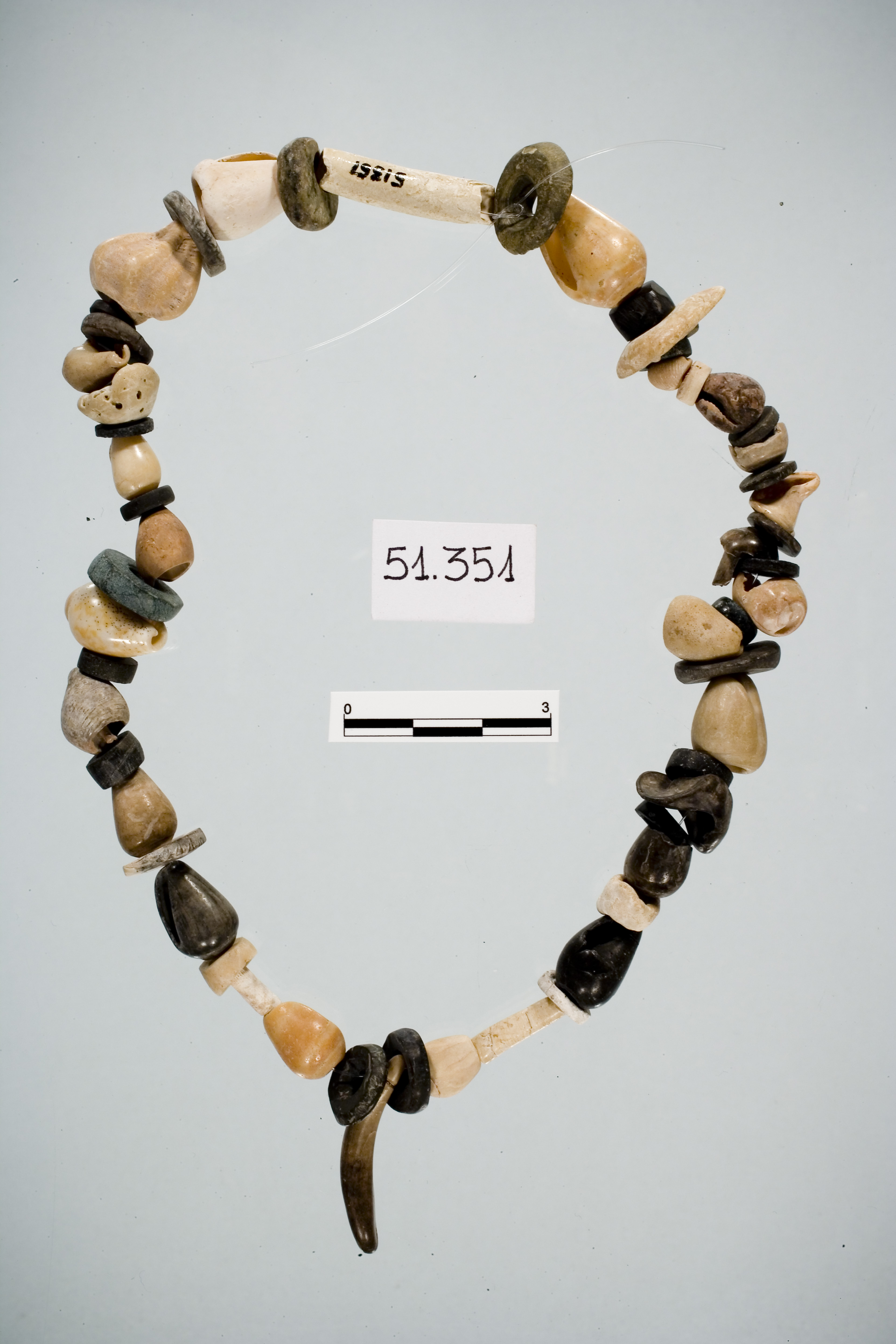
DNecklace consisting of 59 shells. Dated to the Middle Neolithic (Vera, Almería, Spain).

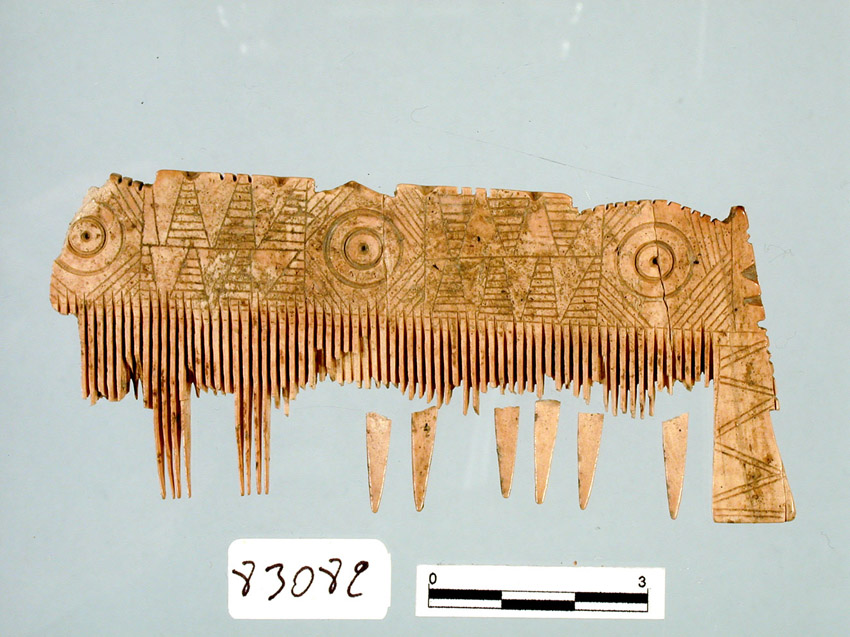
Ivory comb found in the archaeological site of El Chuche (Benahadux, Almería). Dated between the 4th and 2nd centuries BCE.

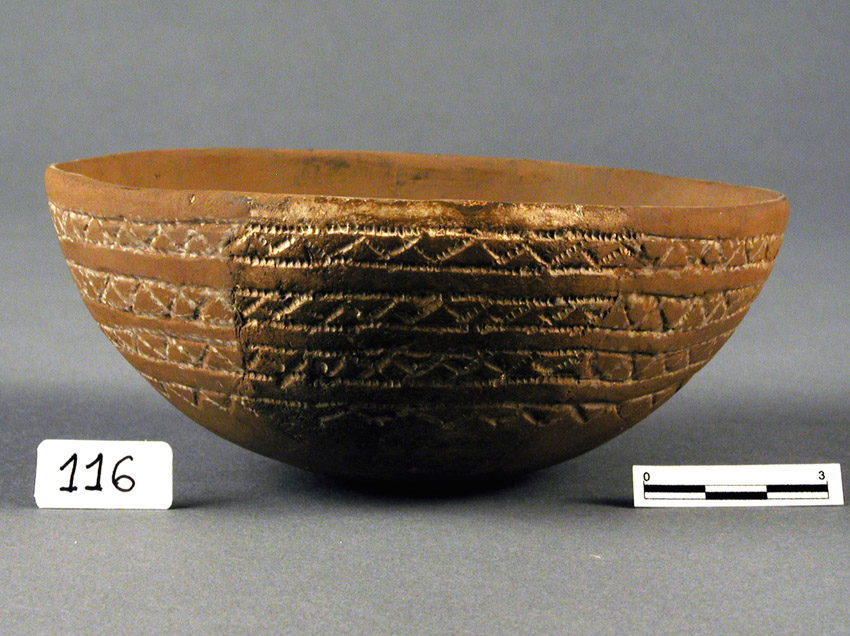
Bowl from a tomb in the necropolis of Los Millares (Almería), one set of the most important Copper Age in Western Europe.

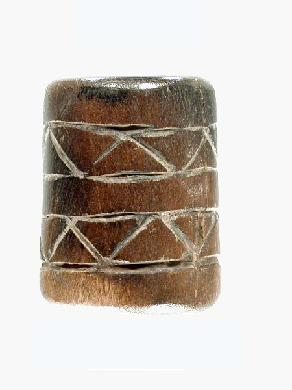
Bone Amulet Pendant. Prehistoric Society of Los Millares. 3200-2250 BCE (Santa Fe de Mondujar, Almería, Spain).

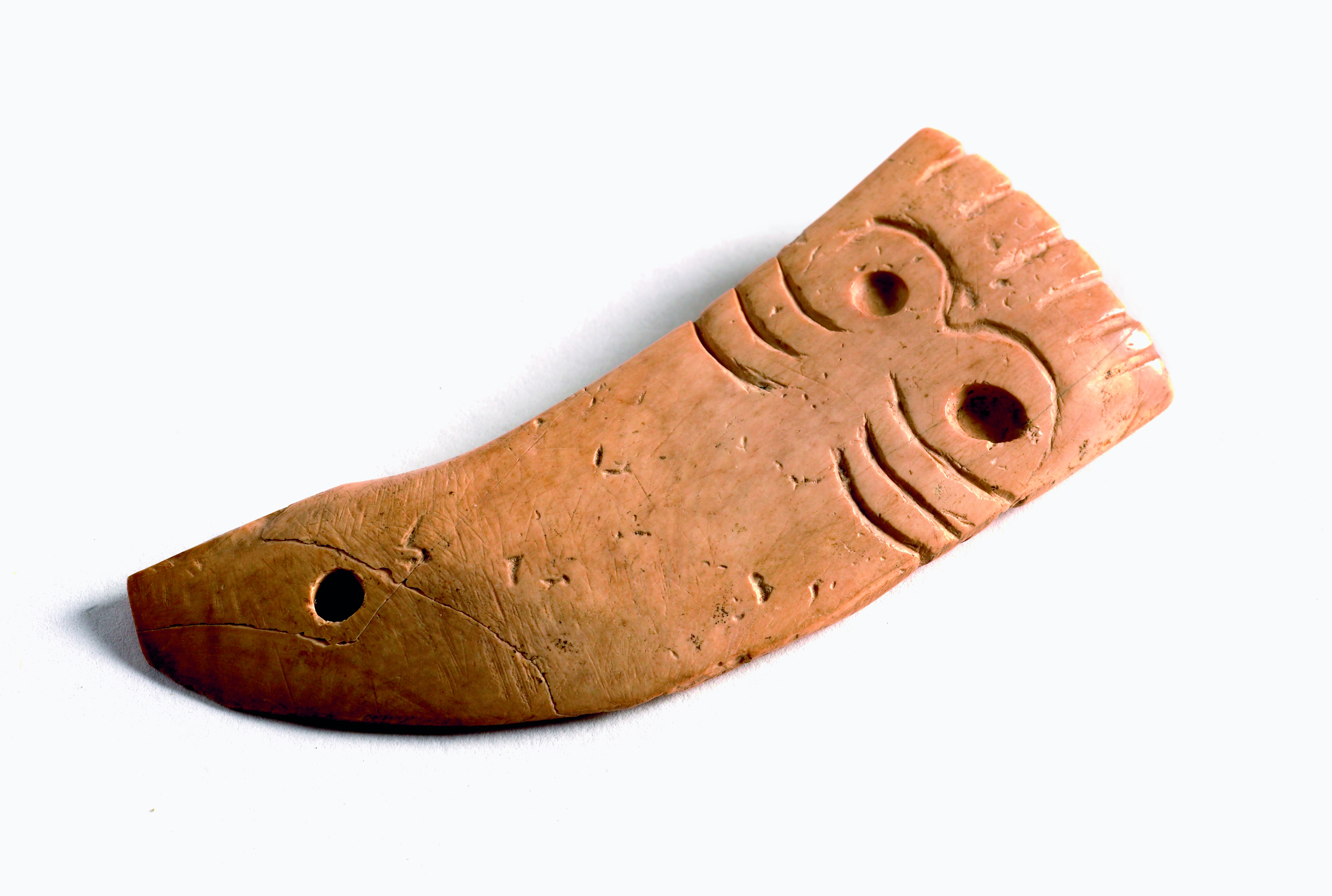
Idol oculado bone shaped horn (Prehistoric Society of Los Millares. 3200-2250 BCE).

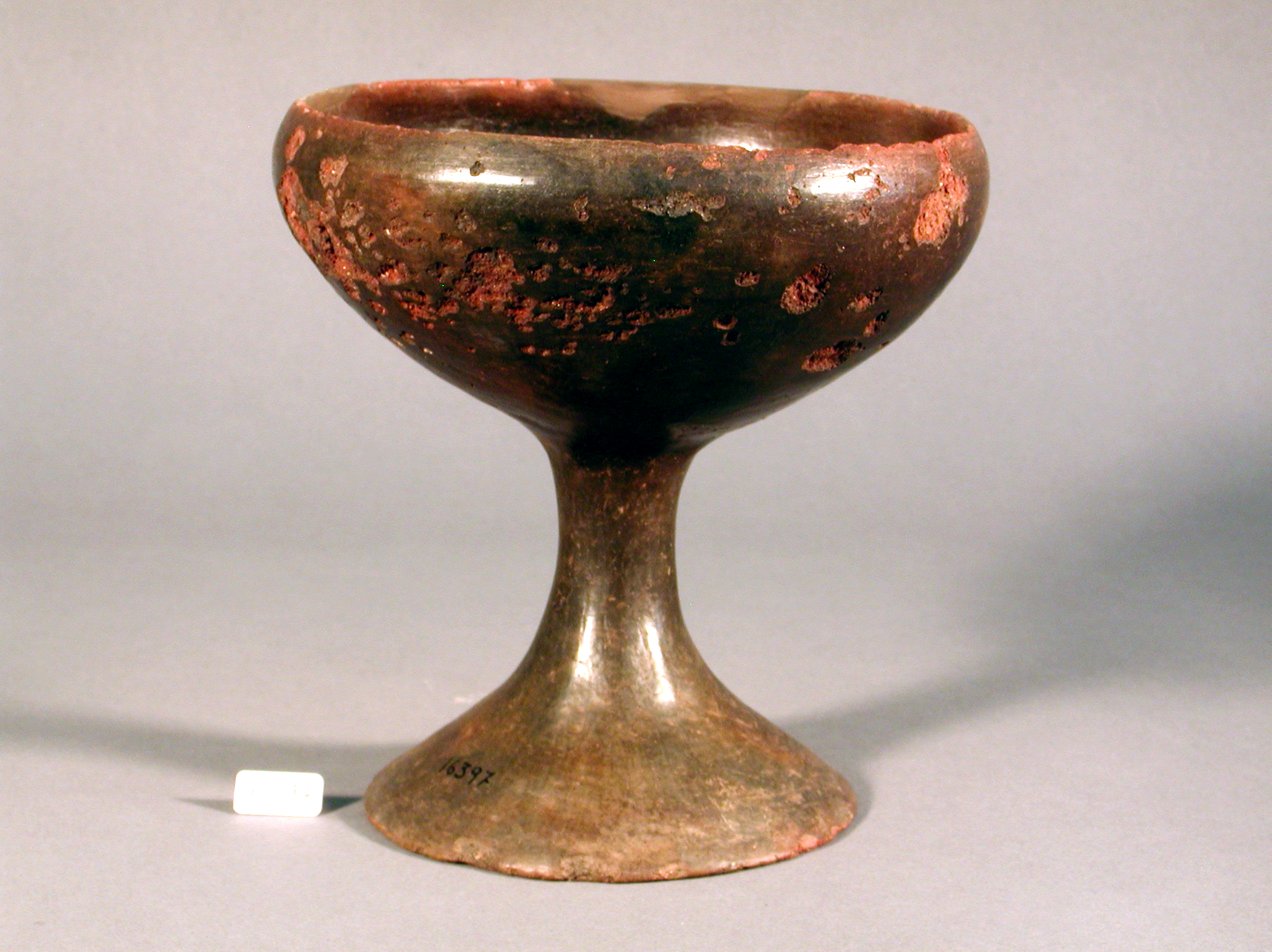
Argárica Ceramic Cup. Found in El Ejido (Almería), comes from a burial. Bronze Age (1700-1300 BCE).

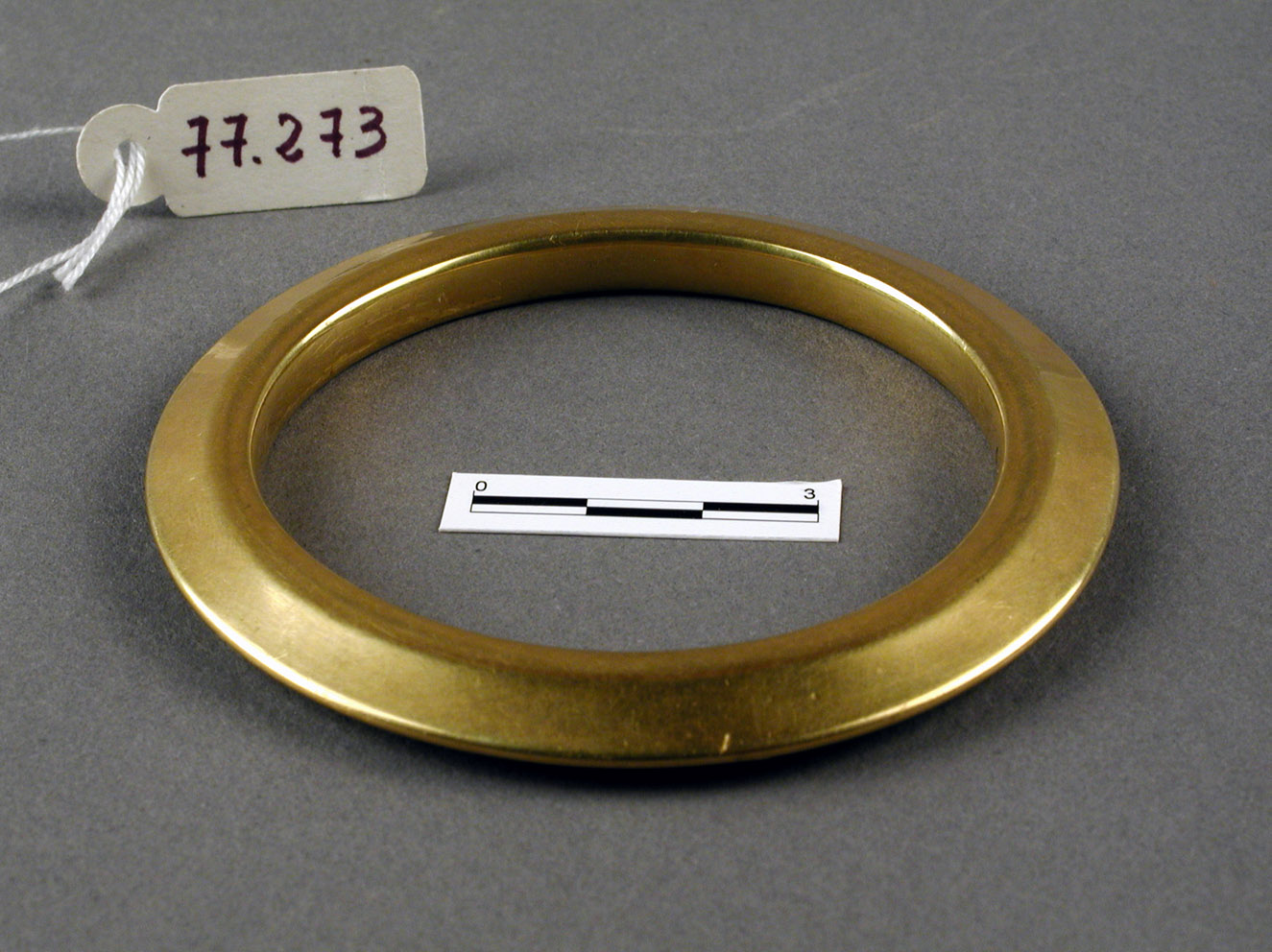
Gold bracelet. Prehistoric Society of El Argar (2250-1550 BCE).

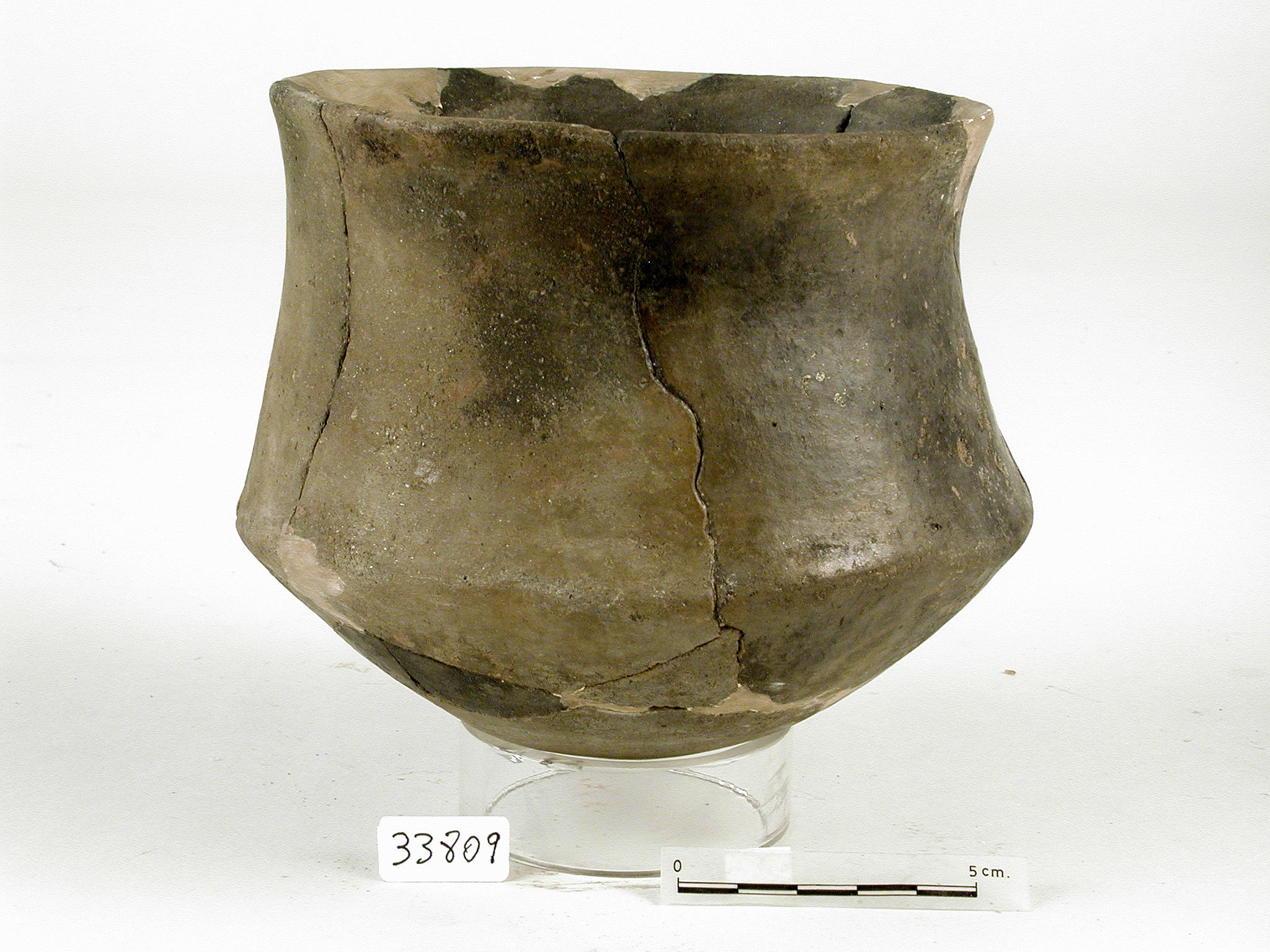
Tulepa burnished argárica (Bronze Age, 2250-1550 BCE).

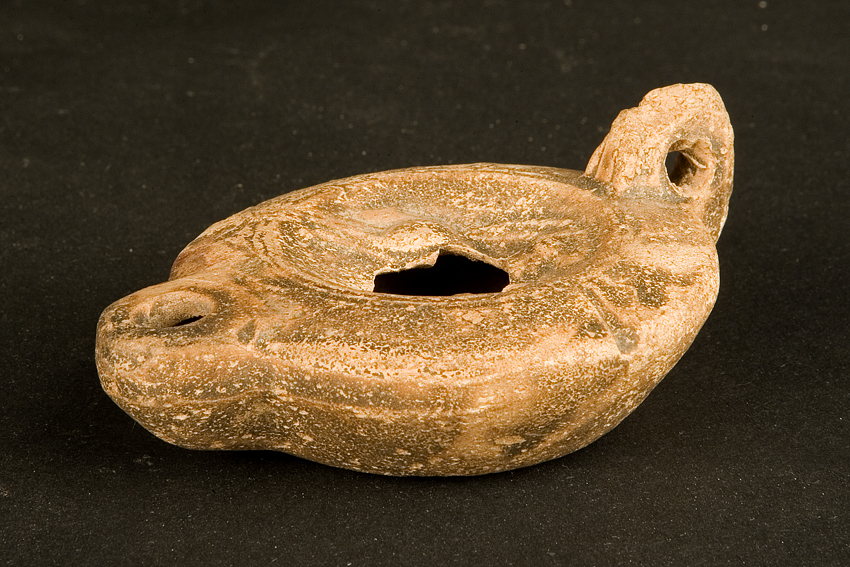
Roman Lucerne (206 BCE - 409).

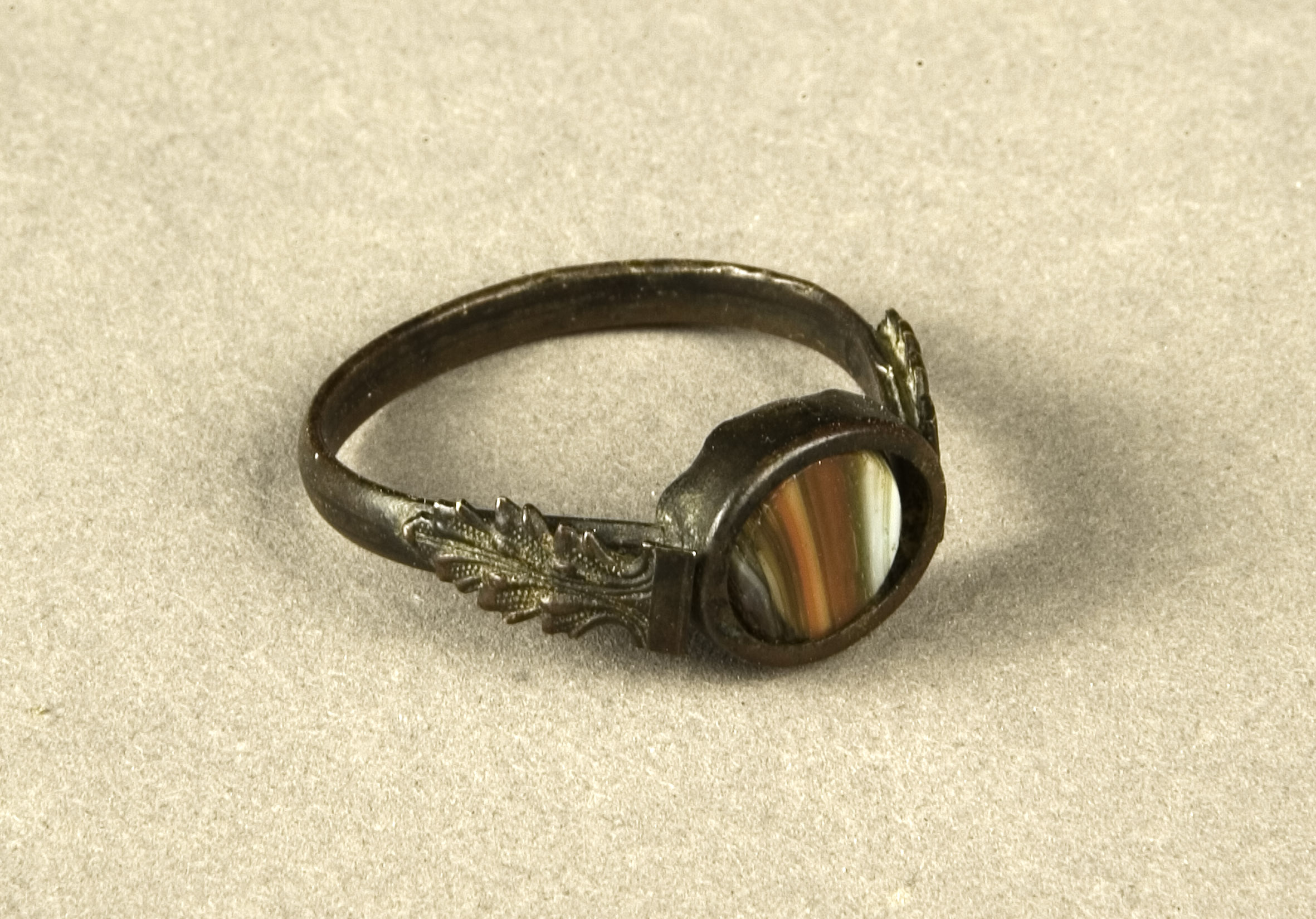
Bronze ring with agate (located in Villaricos, Almería). Romanization (206 BCE - 409).

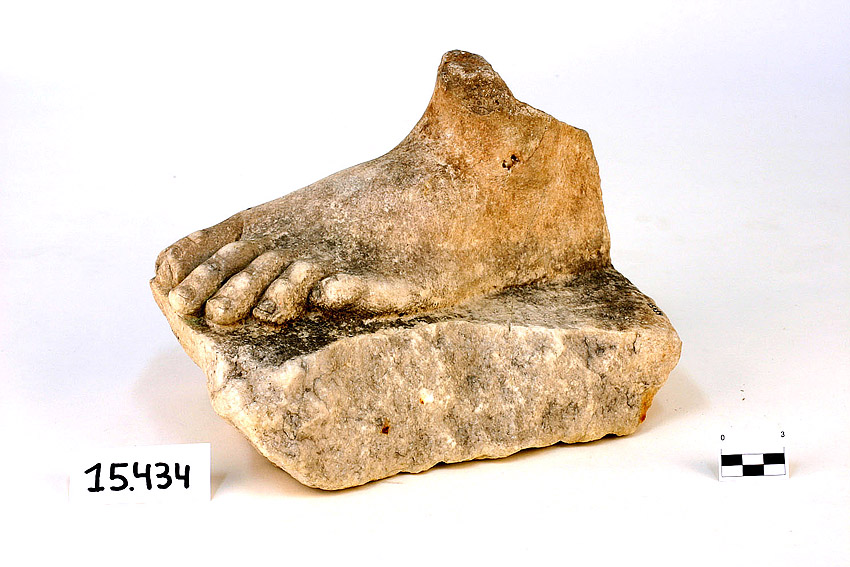
Fragment of a male sculpture in white marble for the left foot. High Roman Empire (Villaricos, Almería).

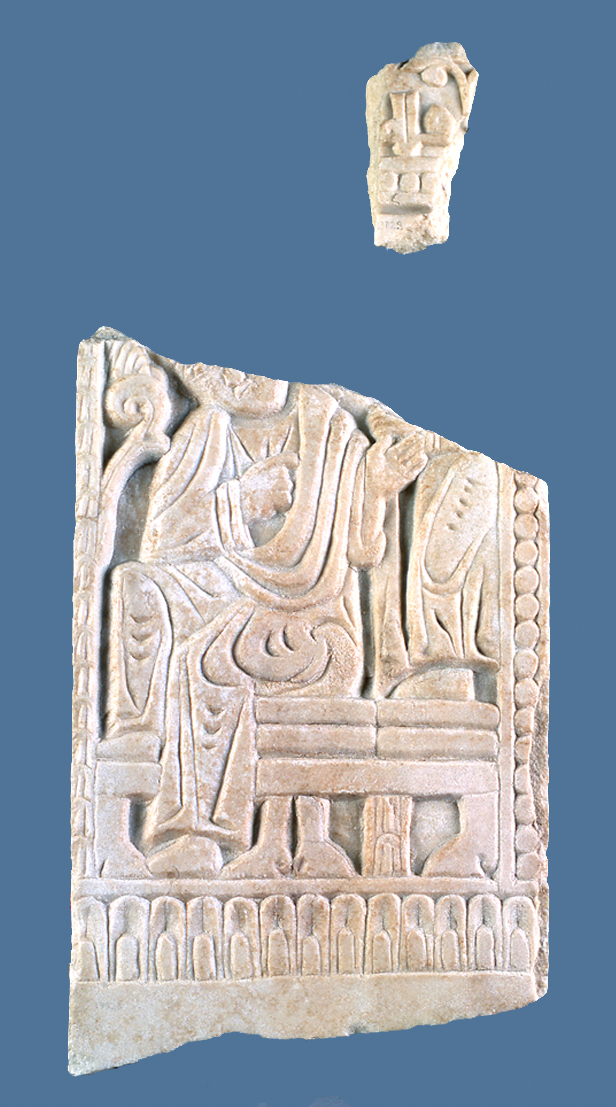
Bas-relief in marble, unique in Spain and in the Islamic West to represent human figures, Al-Andalus (11th century).

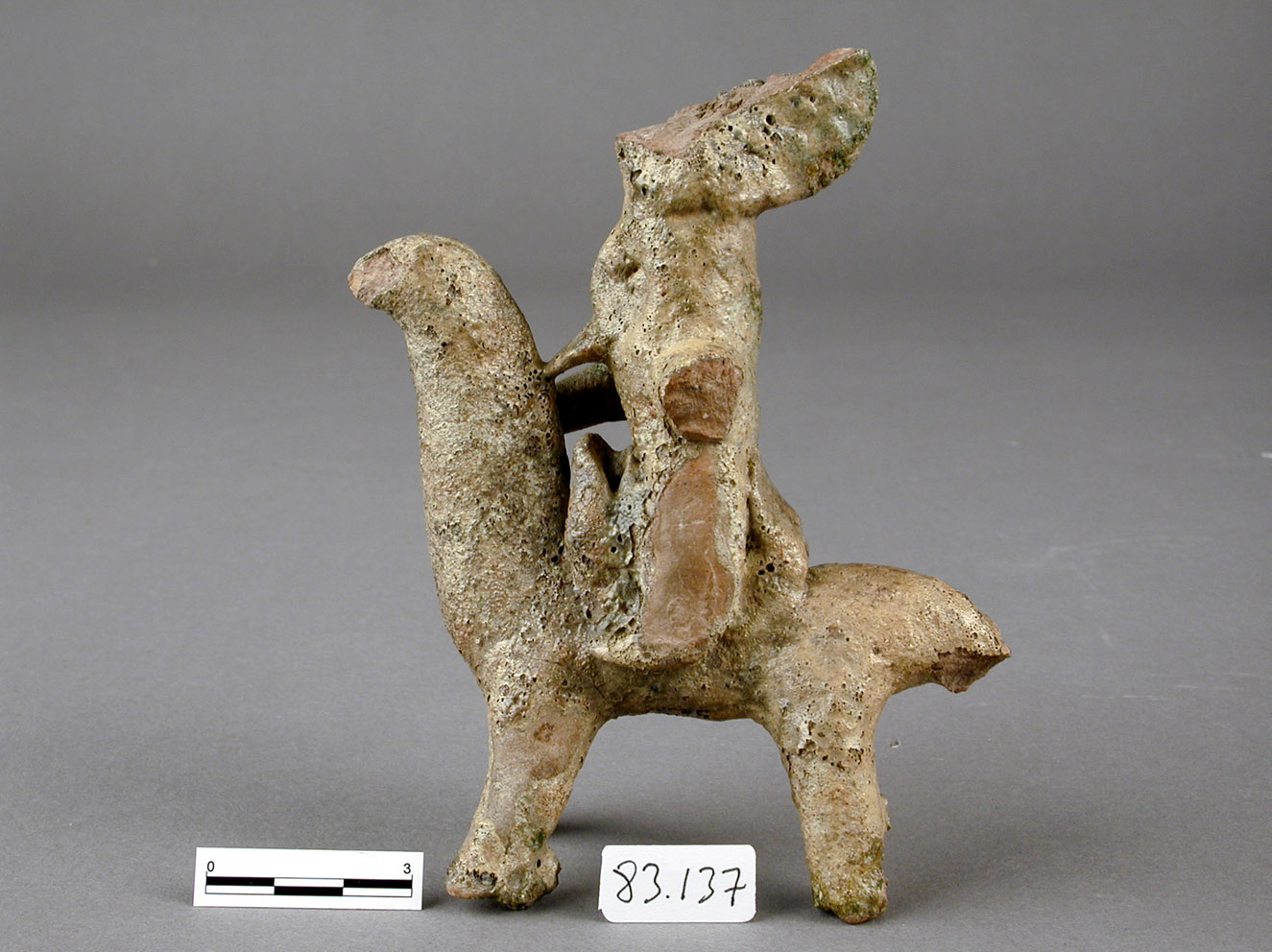
Toys paste by hand. Found Bayyana (Pechina, Almería). Al-Andalus (885-915).

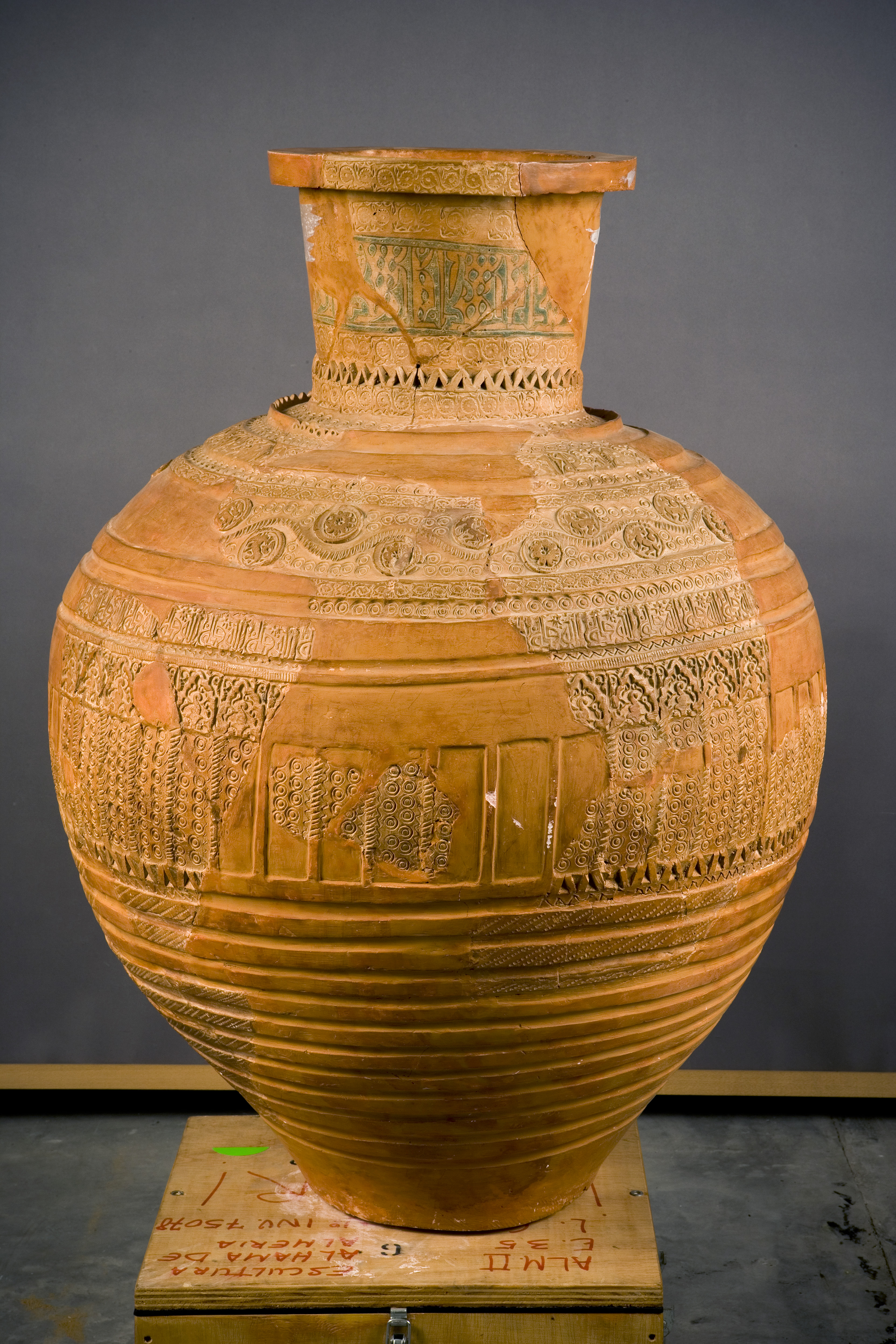
Almahade clay jar (Almería, 1157-1238).
