= Centro Dramático Nacional =

Spanish theatre company in Madrid

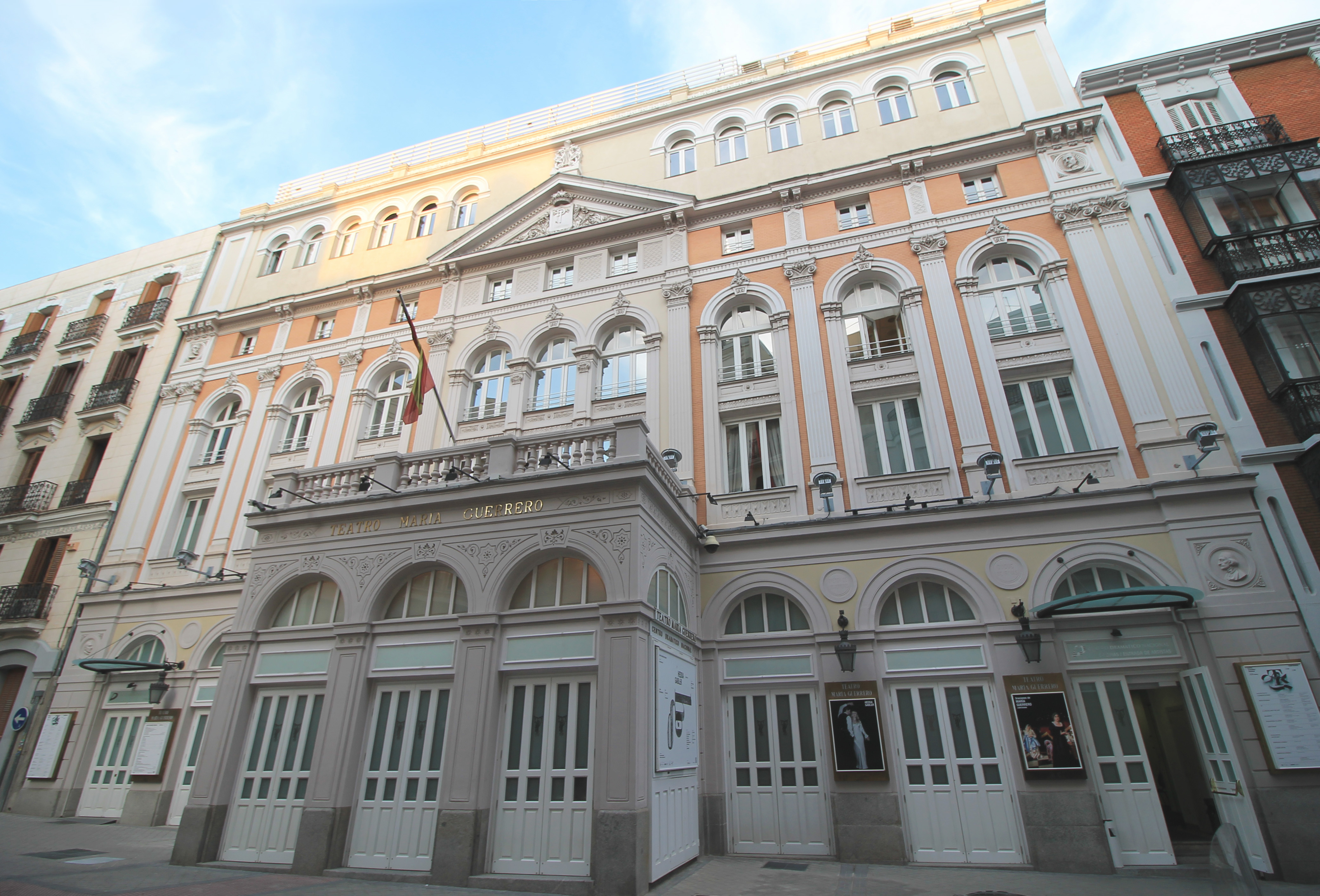
- Teatro María Guerrero, one of two CDN theatres
- Formation: 1978
- Type: Theatre group
- Location: Madrid, Spain
- Website: cdn.mcu.es

The Centro Dramático Nacional ("National Drama Centre" or CDN) is a Madrid-based Spanish theatre company operating under the Instituto de las Artes Escénicas y de la Música (Institute for Performing Arts and Music), an autonomous body of the Spanish Ministry of Culture. It is headquartered in two theatres: the Teatro María Guerrero and the Teatro Valle-Inclán.
