= Ángela García de Paredes =

Spanish architect (born 1958)

- Born: Ángela García de Paredes Falla; 1958 (age 67–68); Madrid, Spain
- Education: Technical University of Madrid
- Occupation: Architect
- Notable work: Teatro Valle-Inclán
- Parents: José María García de Paredes (father); María Isabel de Falla (mother)
- Awards: Spanish Architecture Award (2007); Gold Medal of Merit in the Fine Arts (2014)

Ángela García de Paredes Falla (born 1958) is a Spanish architect. She founded the Paredes Pedrosa studio together with Ignacio García Pedrosa.

== Biography ==
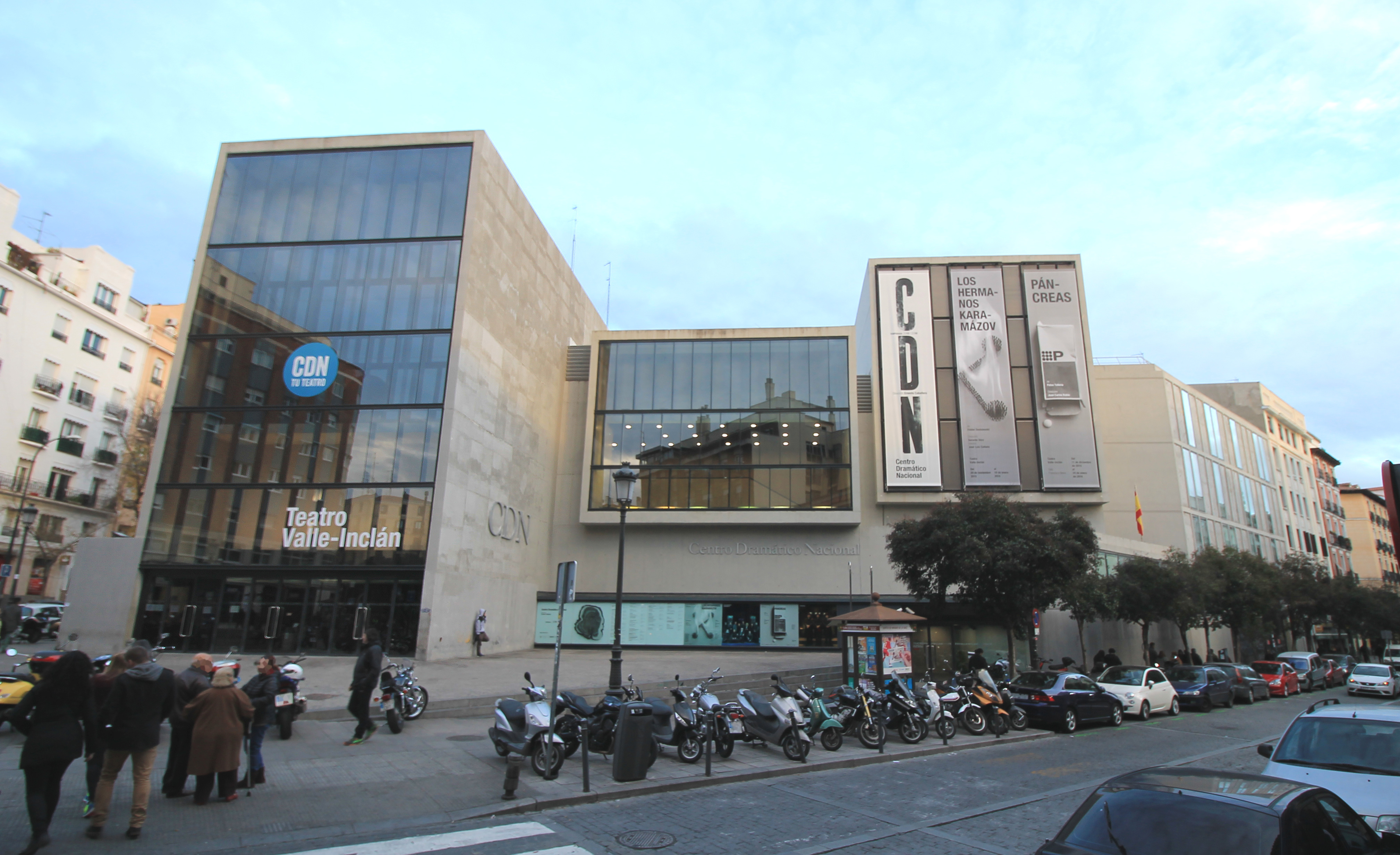
Teatro Valle-Inclán, Madrid

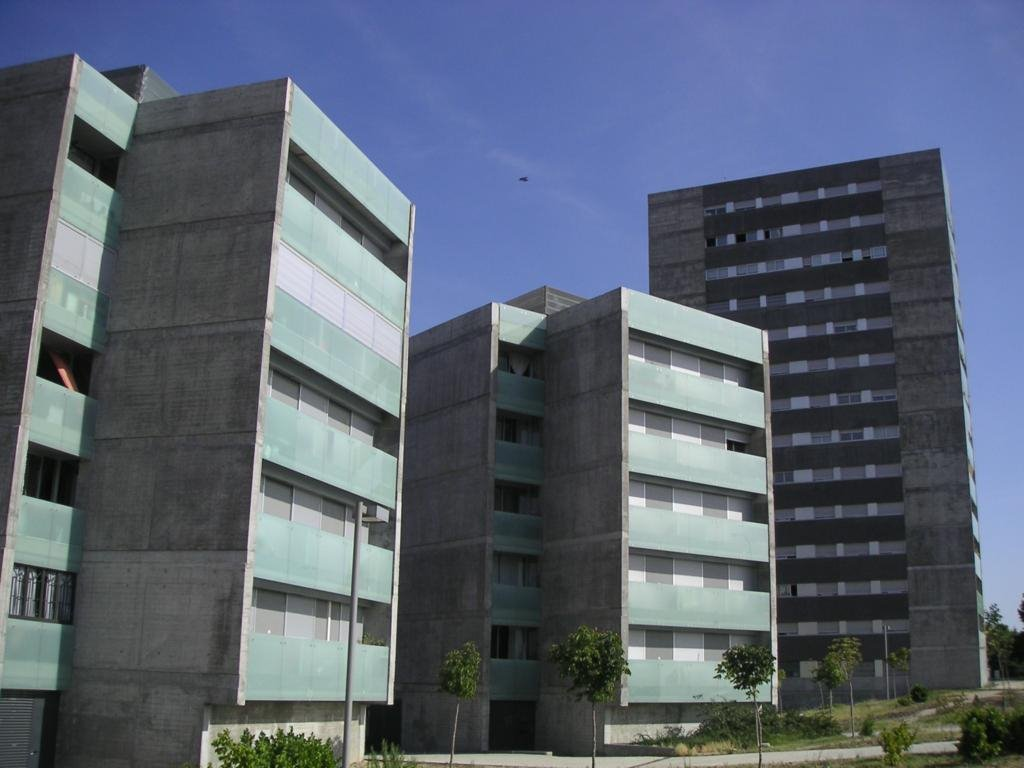
Pradolongo II, Madrid

De Paredes was born in Madrid in 1958. She is the daughter of architect José María García de Paredes and María Isabel de Falla (the daughter of architect Germán de Falla and sister of composer Manuel de Falla).

De Paredes earned a licentiate as an architect from the Superior Technical School of Architecture of Madrid (ETSAM) in 1983, and an Architecture PhD from the Technical University of Madrid in 2015 with the thesis La arquitectura de José M. García de Paredes, ideario de una obra (The Architecture of José M. García de Paredes, the Ideology of a Work).

Together with architect Ignacio García Pedrosa, De Paredes founded the Paredes Pedrosa studio in 1990. They combine the free practice of the profession with teaching work at the universities of Granada, Barcelona, and Navarra. They are professors of ETSAM's Department of Architectural Projects. They have also held critical sessions at the Harvard Graduate School of Design, ETH Zurich, the Accademia di Architettura di Mendrisio, and the École Polytechnique Fédérale de Lausanne. They have been guest lecturers at the universities of São Paulo, Università Iuav di Venezia, Oslo, Monterrey, Puerto Rico, and Münster, as well as the City University of New York, FADU Buenos Aires, the Dallas Architecture Forum, the Polytechnic University of Milan, the Technical University of Munich, the Graz University of Technology, and the Times Center of New York.

De Paredes took control of her father's architecture studio upon his death in 1990.

Since 2011, de Paredes has served as a member of the jury for the Ascensores Enor Architecture Awards.

== Selected projects ==
- Palace of Assembly of Peñíscola, Castellón, 2000–2003, with Ignacio García Pedrosa
- María Moliner Library, Velilla de San Antonio, Madrid, 2000–2003, with Ignacio García Pedrosa
- Museum of Almería, Almería, 1998–2004, with Ignacio García Pedrosa
- Lecture room at the UAM School of Psychology, University City of Cantoblanco, Madrid, 2002–2004, with Ignacio García Pedrosa
- Teatro Olimpia, Madrid, 1996–2005, with Ignacio García Pedrosa
- 146 VPO EMV, Madrid, 2002–2006, with Ignacio García Pedrosa
- Área Arqueológica de la Olmeda, Pedrosa de la Vega, Palencia, 2004–2006, with Ignacio García Pedrosa
- Conservatory of Coimbra, Portugal, 2004 competition, with Ignacio García Pedrosa

== Awards and recognitions ==
In 2007, Ángela García de Paredes and Ignacio García Pedrosa received the Spanish Architecture Award for the Teatro Valle-Inclán in the Lavapiés district of Madrid. In the words of the jury, it was given

For the integration of the project in the regeneration process of the neighborhood and the interactive capacity of the architecture to articulate its external dimensions with the surroundings. Abundant in it is recognition of the coherence that establishes the project with the alignments of the site and the dignity that it returns to the urban landscape, as well as the versatile interior organization of the spaces and the halls, forming a singular piece worth occupying a place of reference in the Spanish architecture of public cultural facilities.

In 2013, they received the Eduardo Torroja Award for Engineering and Architecture from the Eduardo Torroja Foundation and the Ministry of Development for the Villa Romana de la Olmeda in Pedrosa de la Vega. The jury cited "the way in which their audacious structural conception, typical of civil engineering, enhances the clear and resounding expression of their architecture."

In 2014 they received the Gold Medal of Merit in the Fine Arts from the Ministry of Education and the Council of Ministers, as well as the Luis Moreno Mansilla Award ex aequo from the Official Association of Architects of Madrid for their work on the Public Library of Ceuta.
