= Plaza de Lavapiés =

Public square in Madrid, Spain

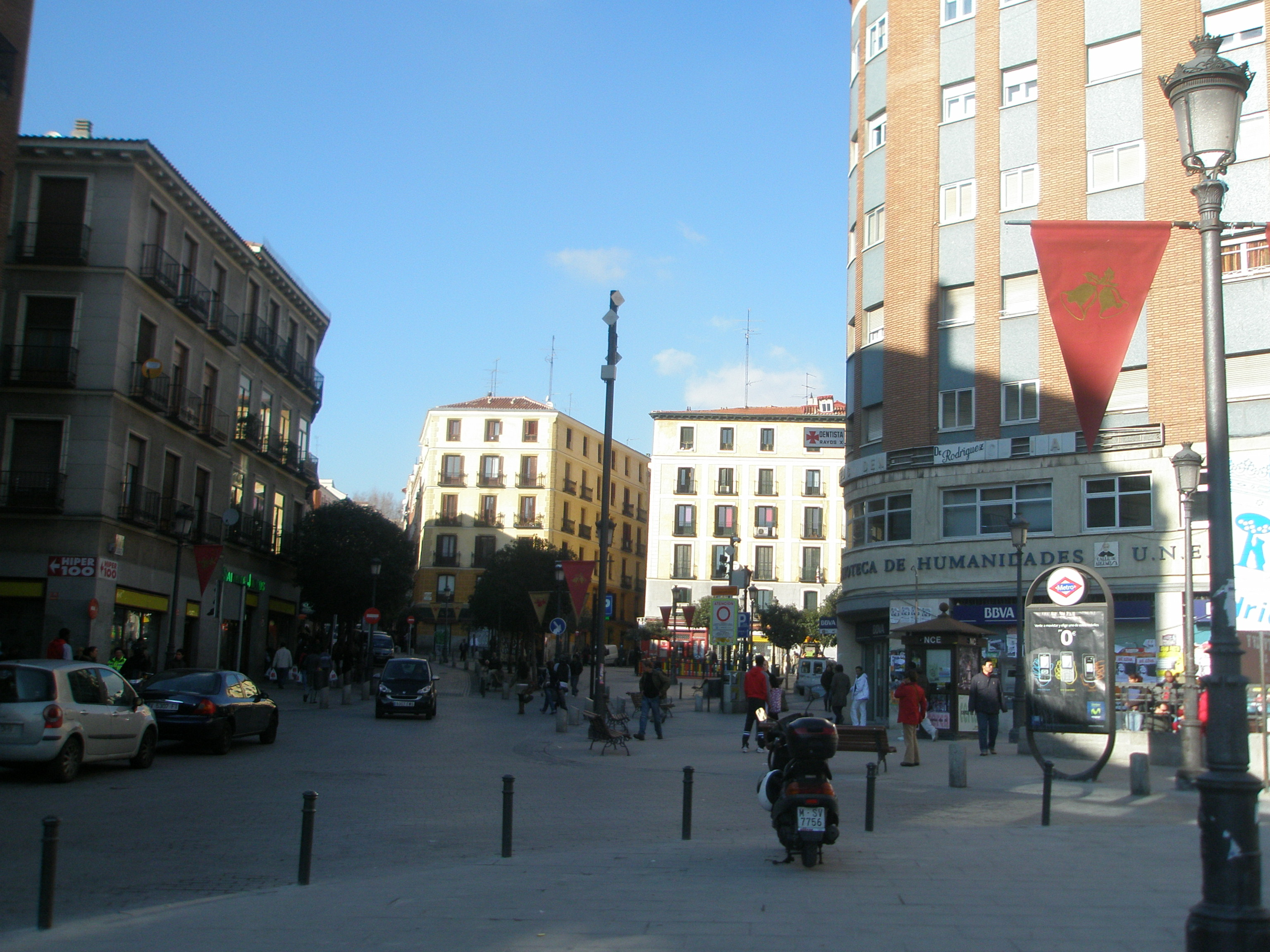
- Interactive map of Plaza de Lavapiés
- Type: Plaza
- Location: Centro, Madrid, Spain
- Coordinates: 40.408897°N 3.701158°W

The Plaza de Lavapiés is a public square in the city of Madrid, Spain. It is located in the area of the same name, Lavapiés.

== History and description ==
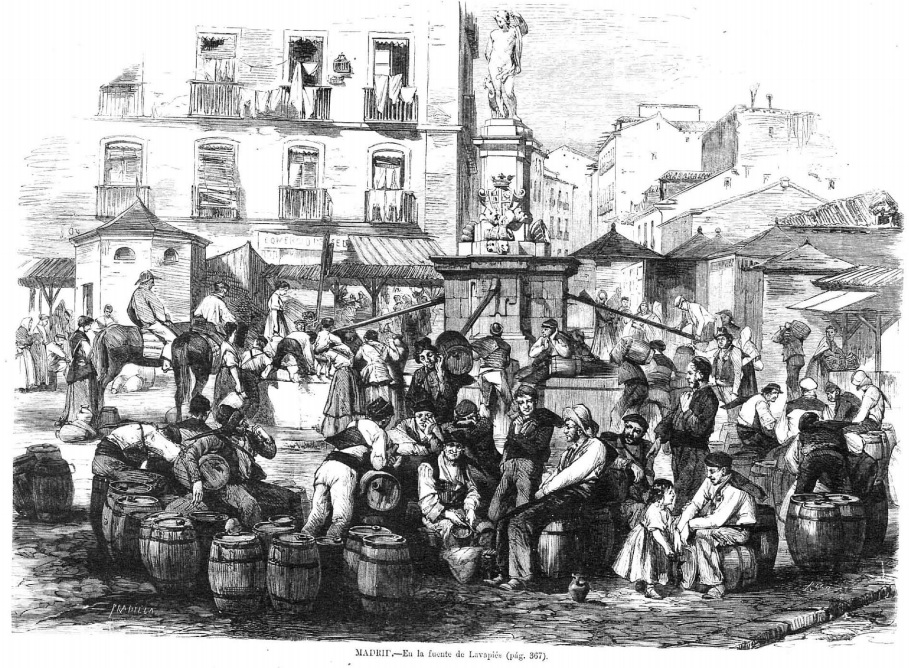
Fountain of Lavapiés

While the origin of the name is somewhat unclear, Lavapiés was the name of a fountain formerly existing in the location of the current plaza.

Though intended as a simple widening of streets, the plaza became a marketplace and space for socialization. The square has been used as a place to voice opinions about local issues such as perceived gentrification and the increase of tourists in the area. The Sala Olimpia (a 1925 building by Secundino Zuazo) was demolished in 2001 and replaced by the Valle Inclán Theatre, inaugurated in 2006 to some local controversy.

The square is located in the administrative neighborhood of Embajadores (part of the Centro District). The Argumosa, Ave María, de la Fe, Lavapiés, Olivar, Sombrerete, Tribulete, and Valencia streets all converge in the square.
