= Pedrosa de la Vega =

- municipality
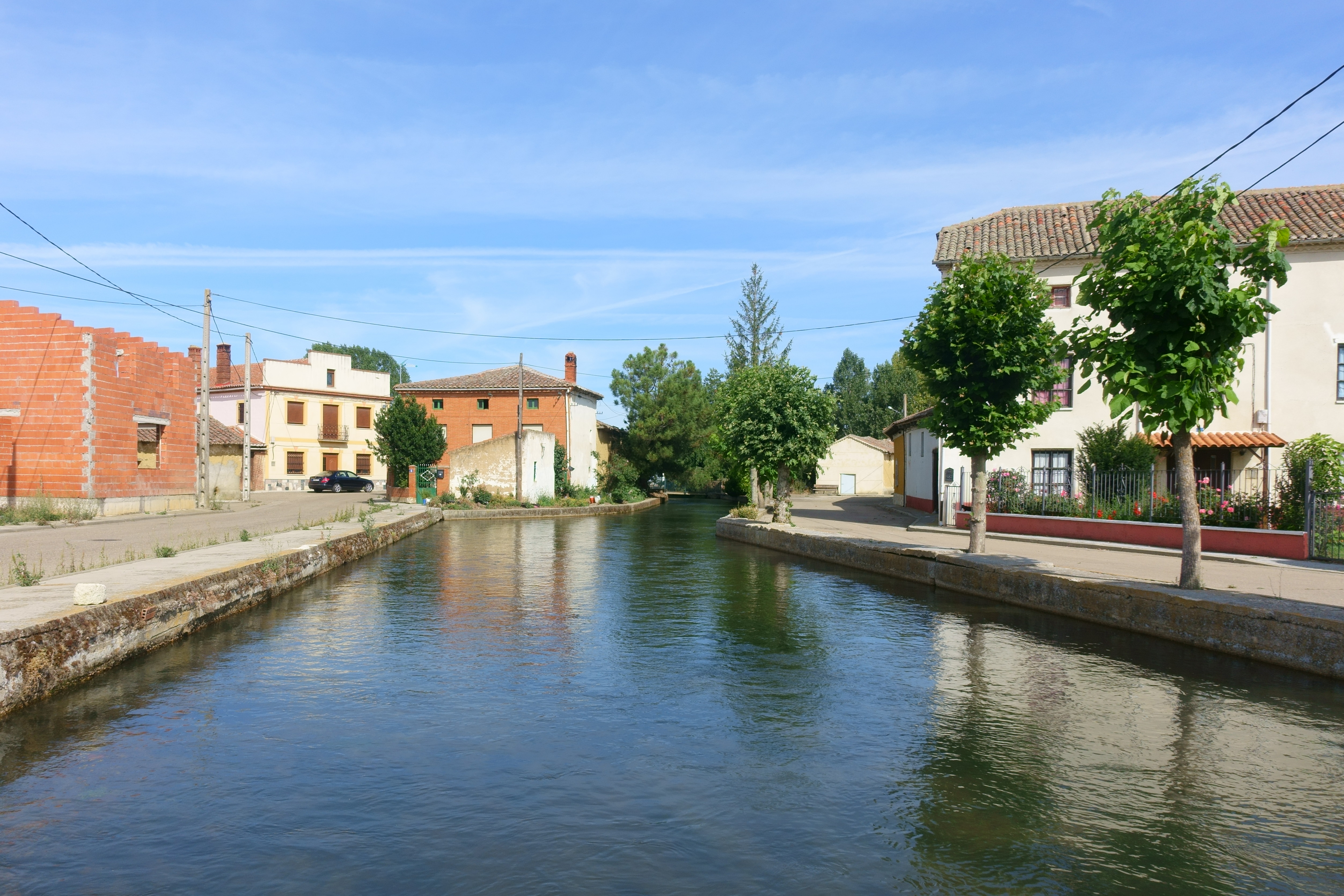

- Pedrosa de la Vega Pedrosa de la Vega (Europe)
- Coordinates: 42.29°N 4.45°W
- Country: Spain
- Autonomous community: Castile and León
- Province: Palencia
- Municipality: Pedrosa de la Vega

Area
  - Total: 21.06 km^{2} (8.13 sq mi)
- Elevation: 890 m (2,920 ft)

Population (2025-01-01)
  - Total: 277
  - Density: 13.2/km^{2} (34.1/sq mi)
- Time zone: UTC+1 (CET)
  - Summer (DST): UTC+2 (CEST)
- Website: Official website

Pedrosa de la Vega is a municipality located in the province of Palencia, Castile and León, Spain. According to the 2004 census (INE), the municipality had a population of 366 inhabitants.

== Monuments ==
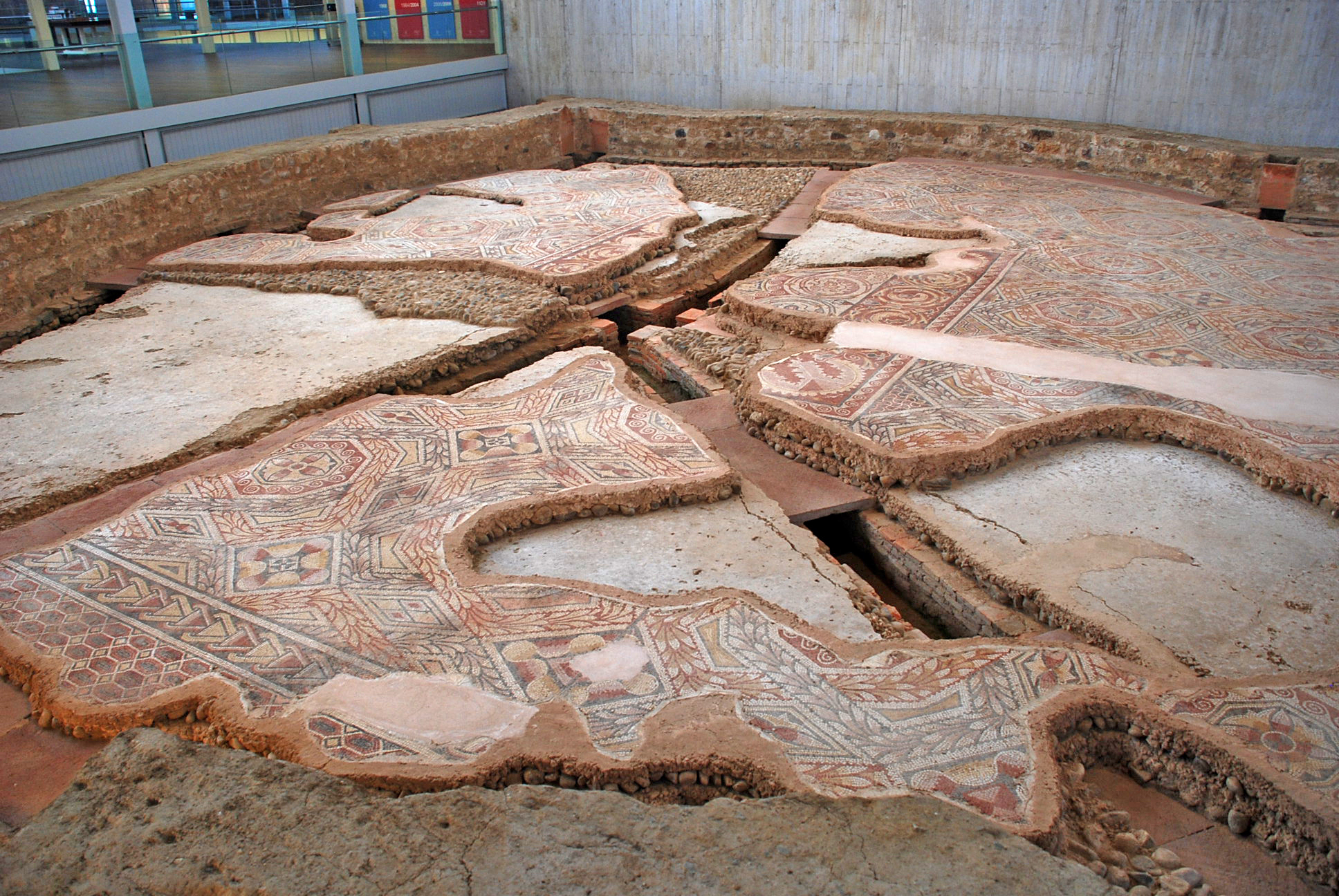
Ancient Roman thermae in Roman villae of La Olmeda.

- Roman villae of La Olmeda: The palatial Late Antique Roman villa at La Olmeda is situated less than 1 km away from the village of Pedrosa. Long known as the provenance of chance finds, it was finally professionally excavated from 1968, and was a declared a Bien de Interés Cultural, 3 April 1996. The site was donated in 1984 to the Diputación de Palencia by its proprietor and discoverer, Javier Cortes Álvarez de Miranda, who had supported the archaeological investigation of the site from 1969 to 1980. It is open to the public, while a museum dedicated to the finds is housed in the nearby church of San Pedro de Saldaña.
- Church of Saint Martin: It has been remade in modern times, with three naves, with Baroque plasterwork, avitelada cover. On the Gospel side, Salomon Baroque altarpiece with sculpture of Ecce Homo; on the side of the epistle, altarpiece des 16th century with an immaculate of that same century. In the presbytery, altarpiece from the 18th century, a San Martín Bishop of 16th.
