= Luis Siret =

Archaeologist, illustrator

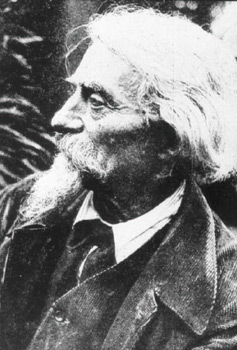
- Born: Luis Siret y Cels; 26 August 1860; Sint-Niklaas, East Flanders, Flemish Region, Belgium
- Died: 7 June 1934 (aged 73); Las Herrerías, Almeria, Spain
- Occupations: Archaeologist and illustrator
- Spouse: Magdalena Belpaire de Siret
- Relatives: Henri Siret

Luis Siret y Cels (26 August 1860, in Sint-Niklaas – 7 June 1934, in Las Herrerías) was a Belgian-Spanish archaeologist and illustrator.

He was born in Belgium, but when he was 21 he went to Cuevas del Almanzora (Almería) when he was contracted as a Mining Engineer in the Sierra Almagrera.

Through 50 years, Luis Siret and his brother Enrique Siret investigated Neolithic, Chalcolithic and Bronze Age sites in Almizaraque, Palacés, El Argar, El Gárcel or Los Millares. His discoveries meant a great advance in the prehistory of the South-eastern Iberian Peninsula and helped settle the sequence from Palaeolithic to Iron Age in the zone.

Enrique and Luis Siret published the results of their first excavations in 1887 in Antwerp as Les premiers âges du métal dans le Sud-Est de l’Espagne, a two-volume work consisting of a text volume and an in-folio atlas in which Luis Siret drew around 8,000 objects along with plans and views of the excavated sites. The book received the Martorell Prize and a gold medal at the Toulouse Universal Exposition in 1887, followed by another gold medal at the Barcelona exposition in 1888. A Spanish edition, Las primeras edades del metal en el Sudeste de España, appeared in Barcelona in 1890. These discoveries marked a major advance in the study of prehistory in southeastern Iberia. After Enrique’s permanent return to Belgium in 1886, Luis Siret continued excavating for the rest of his life with his foreman Pedro Flores, work he pursued alongside directing the Almagrera Mining Company, founded in 1900.

Material which he collected was exhibited in 1889 Exposition universelle de Paris and 1929 Exposición Universal de Barcelona. Items are currently exhibited in the Museo Arqueológico Provincial de Almería, in the Museo arqueológico Nacional in Madrid, in the Musée du Cinquantenaire in Brussels and several other important collections including the British Museum in London and the Ashmolean Museum in Oxford.

== Bibliography ==
- Herguido, Carlos, (1994), Apuntes y documentos sobre Enrique y Luis Siret, ingenieros y arqueólogos. Instituto de Estudios Almerienses y Ayuntamiento de Cuevas del Almanzora, Almería.
- Herguido, Carlos (ERRATA): http://1drv.ms/1q0FWNb
- Siret, Luis y Enrique (2006), Las Primeras Edades del Metal en el Sudeste de España (Facsímil ed.), Museo Arqueológico de Murcia, Murcia, España, MU-584-2006 [9 de julio de 2007]
