= Los Millares =

Chalcolithic occupation site in Spain

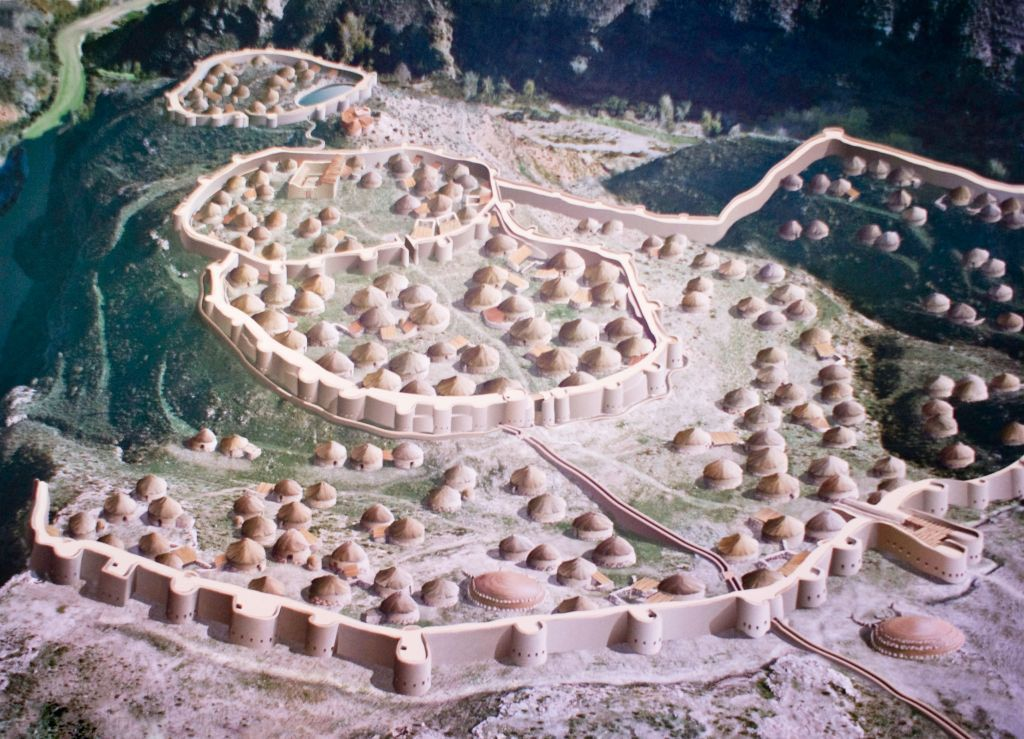
- A model of the prehistoric town of Los Millares, with its walls

- Location in Andalusia, Spain
- 36°57′53″N 02°31′20″W
- Type: Settlement
- Location: Santa Fe de Mondújar, Andalusia, Spain

History
- Built: c. 3025 BC
- Abandoned: c. 2000 BC

Site notes
- Area: 2 ha (4.9 acres)
- Discovered: 1891

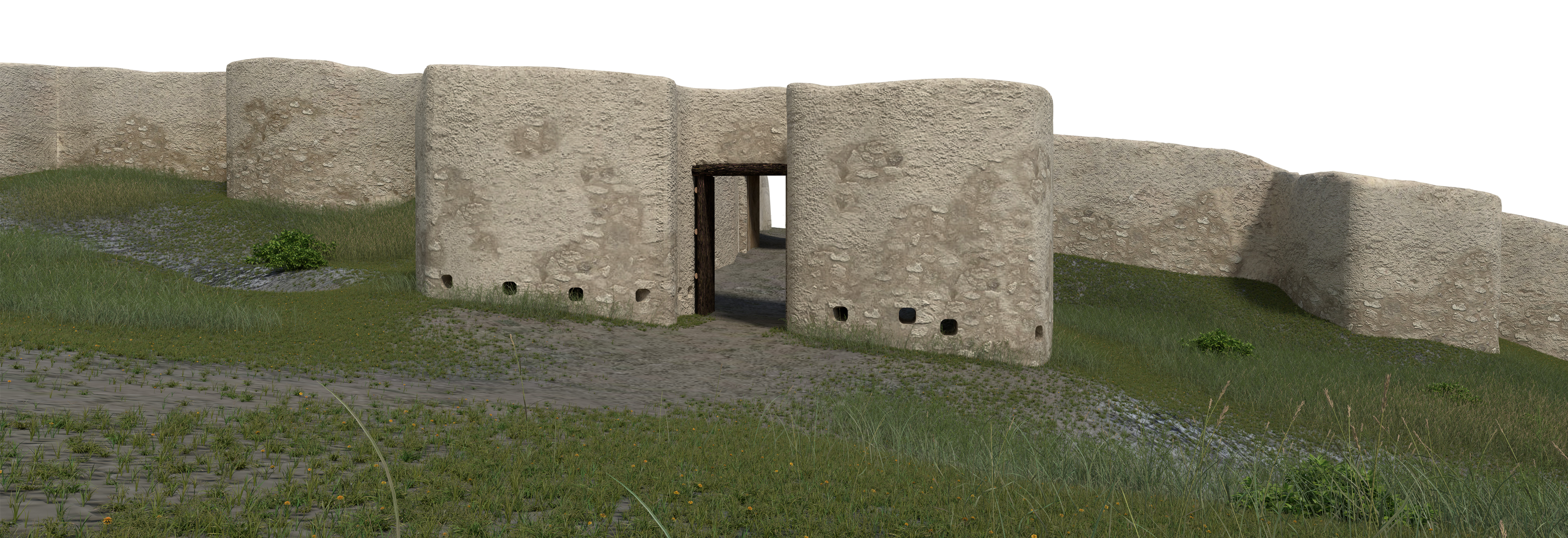
Reconstruction of fortifications

Los Millares is a Chalcolithic occupation site 17 km north of Almería, in the municipality of Santa Fe de Mondújar, Andalucía, Spain. The complex was in use from the fourth millennium BC (c. 3025 BC) to the end of the third millennium BC (c. 2000 BC) and probably supported around 1,000 people. It was discovered in 1891 during the construction of a railway. It was first excavated by Luis Siret in the succeeding years. Excavations are ongoing. Los Millares is the type site of the Chalcolithic Millaran culture.

== Site description ==
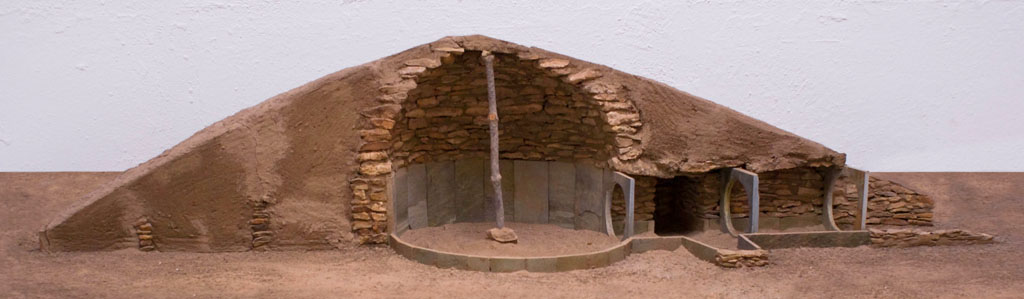
Model of a tomb

The site covers 2 hectares (4.9 acres) and comprises three concentric lines of stone walls, the outer ring the largest, running more than 200 meters (650 feet) with 19 'bastions' and a gate guarded by foreworks. The road to the site is guarded by four smaller outlying stone forts. There is an extensive cemetery of eighty passage grave tombs. Radiocarbon dating has established that one wall collapsed and was rebuilt around 3025 BC.

A cluster of simple dwellings lay inside the walls as well as one large building containing evidence of copper smelting. Pottery excavated from the site included plain and decorated wares including symbolkeramik bowls bearing oculus motifs. Similar designs appear on various carved stone idols found at the site. Although primarily farmers, the inhabitants of Los Millares had crucially also learned metal working, especially the smelting and forming of copper, and the site is considered highly important in understanding the transition from the Neolithic to the Bronze Age. The Millaran culture eventually came to dominate the Iberian peninsula.

The population of Los Millares has been estimated at 1,000 in the timeframe 3200–2300 BC. The labor involved in its construction, the large volume of stones used, its geometric characteristics and sophisticated design all indicate multiple functionality, including defense and power.

== Relationship to other prehistoric cultures ==
Los Millares participated in the continental trends of Megalithism and the Beaker culture. Analysis of occupation material and grave goods from the Los Millares cemetery of 70 tholos tombs with port-hole slabs has led archaeologists to suggest that the people who lived at Los Millares were part of a stratified, unequal society which was often at war with its neighbors. The Los Millares culture was replaced around 1800 BC, with the arrival of Bronze by the El Argar culture, whose successor culture is embodied in the contemporary culture of Vila Nova de São Pedro in nearby Portugal.

Other Iberian settlements in this region of a similar age to Los Millares include the settlement of Los Silillos and Neolithic finds at Cabrera.

Similarities between Los Millares architecture and the step pyramid at Monte d'Accoddi in Sardinia have been noticed.

== Conservation and access ==
The site has been protected by a heritage designation, currently Bien de Interés Cultural, since 1931.

There is an interpretation centre at the site itself. Some finds are displayed at the National Archaeological Museum in Madrid, and others at the Museum of Almería.

Archaeological works are carrying out from October 2026.

== Gallery ==
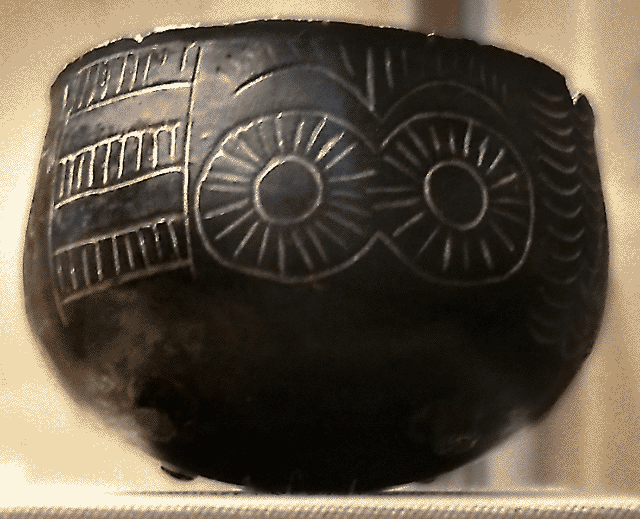
Reproduction of a Millarense bowl with the typical eyes motif of the chalcolithic of SE Iberia

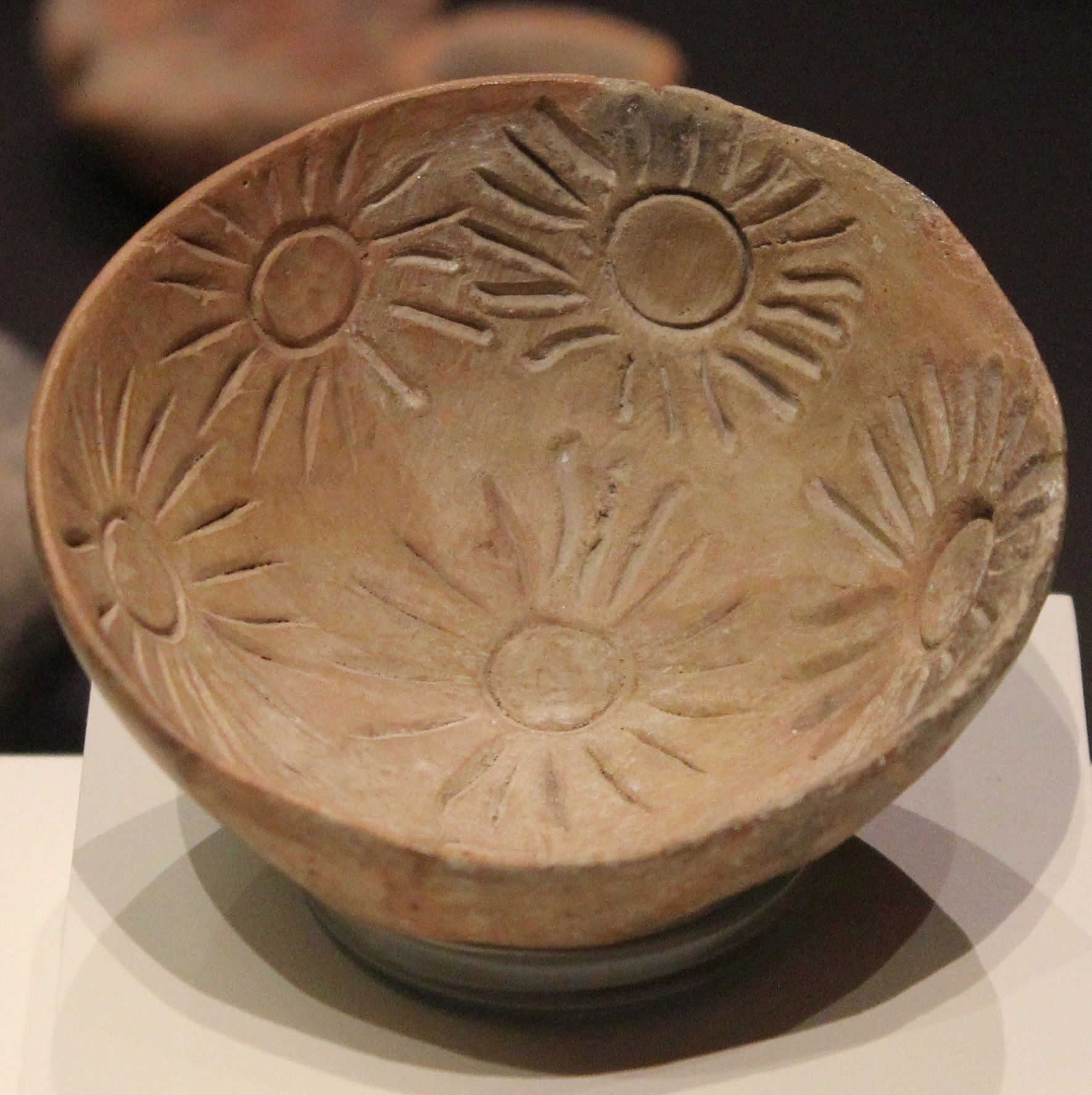

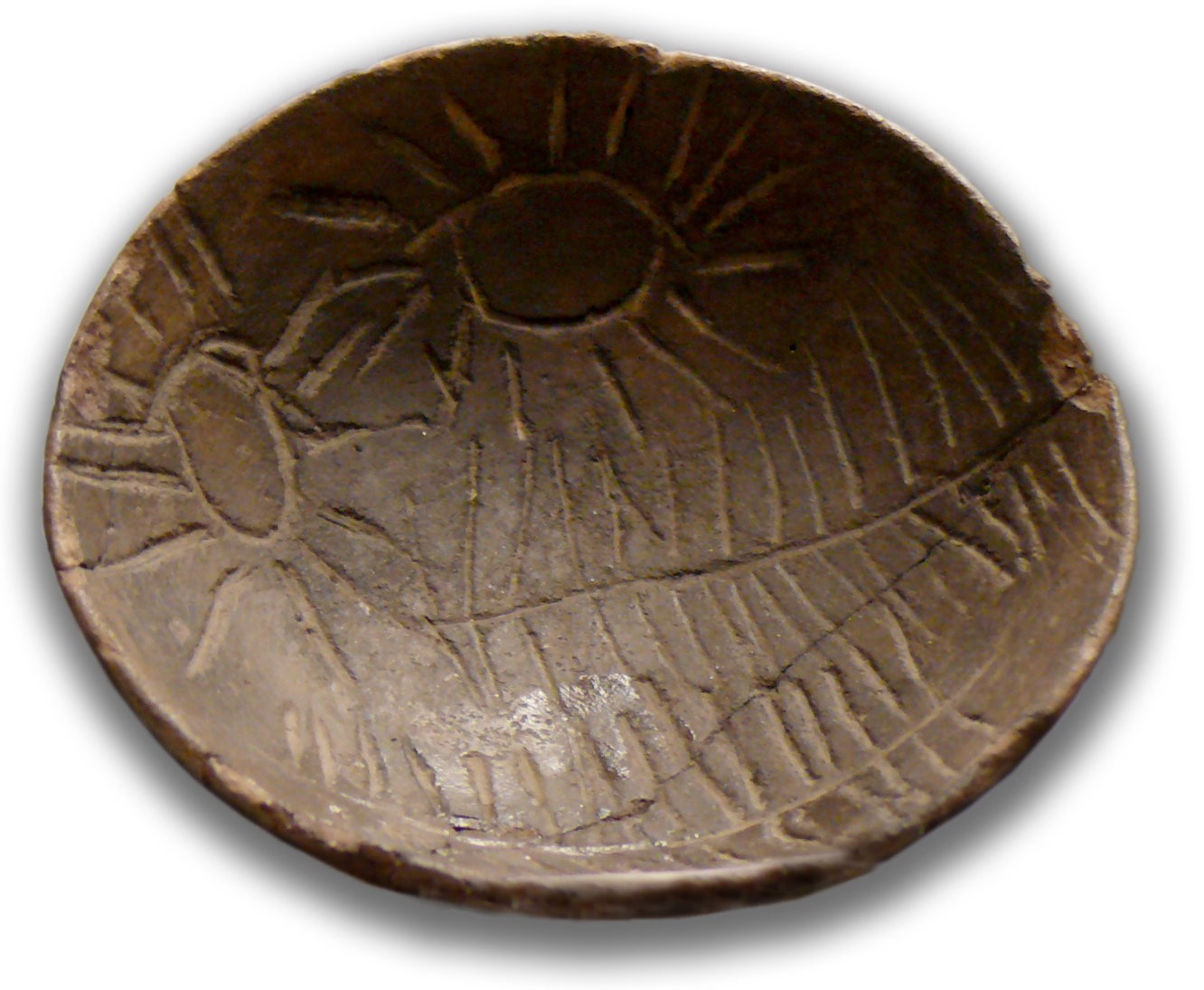

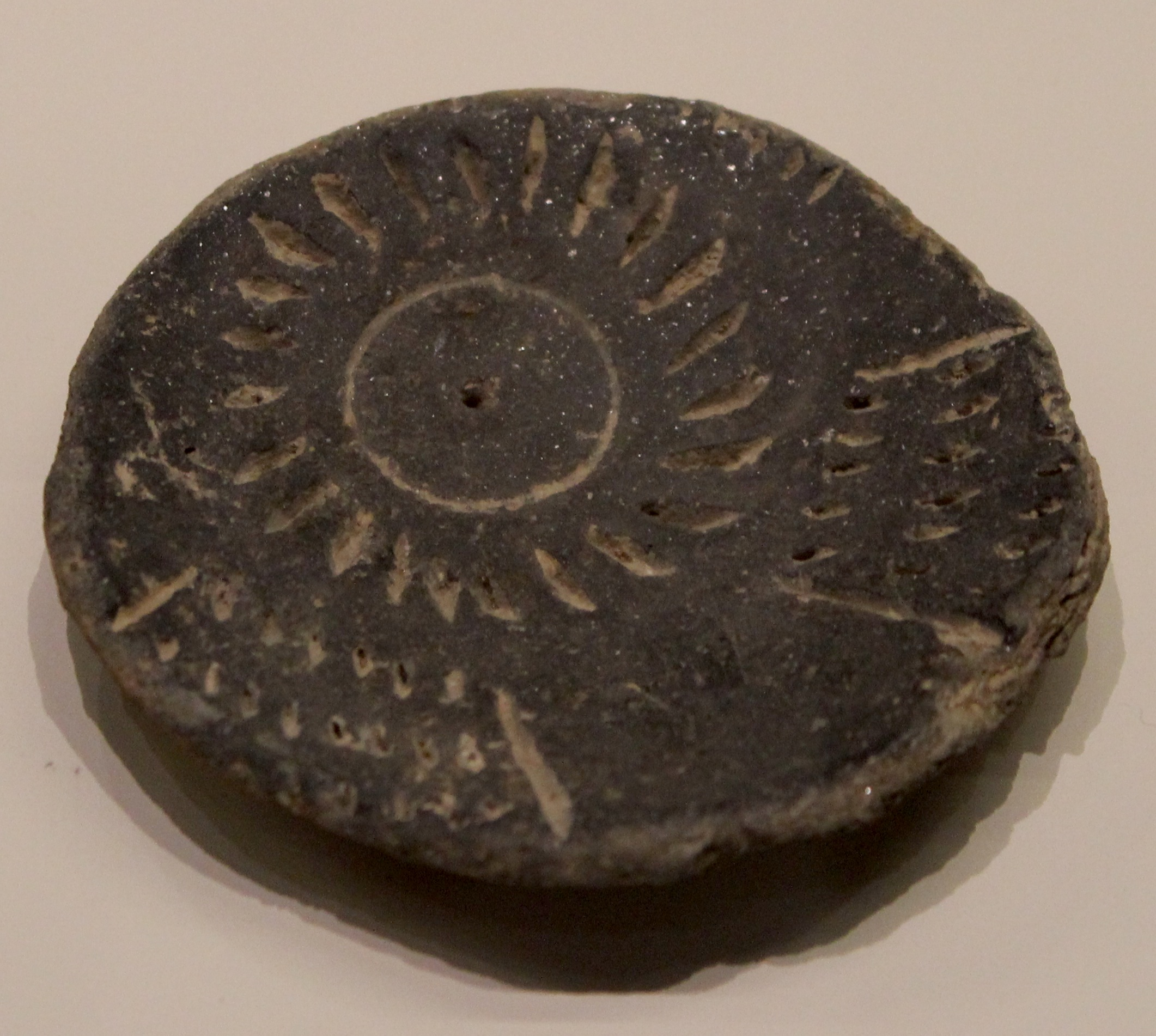

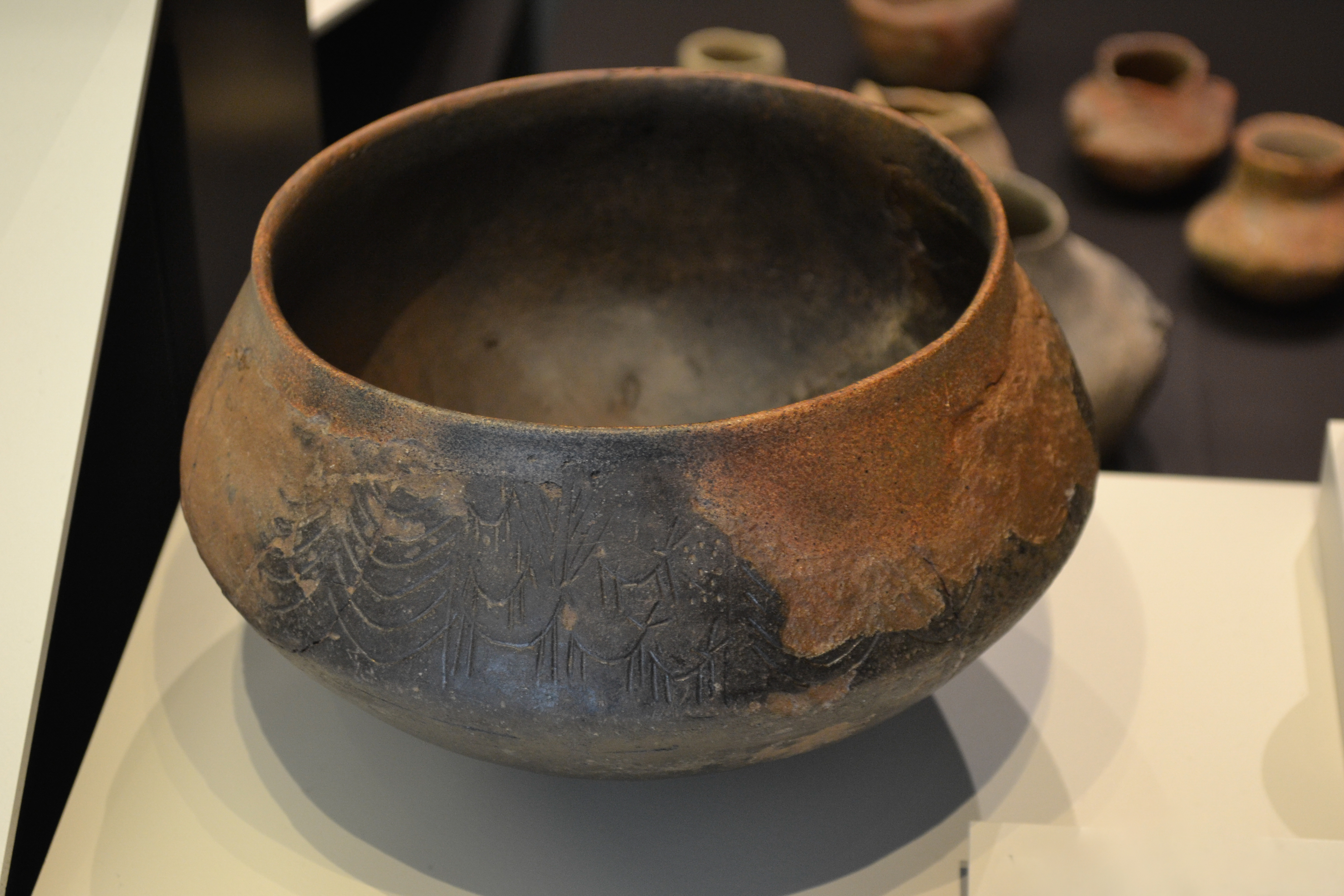

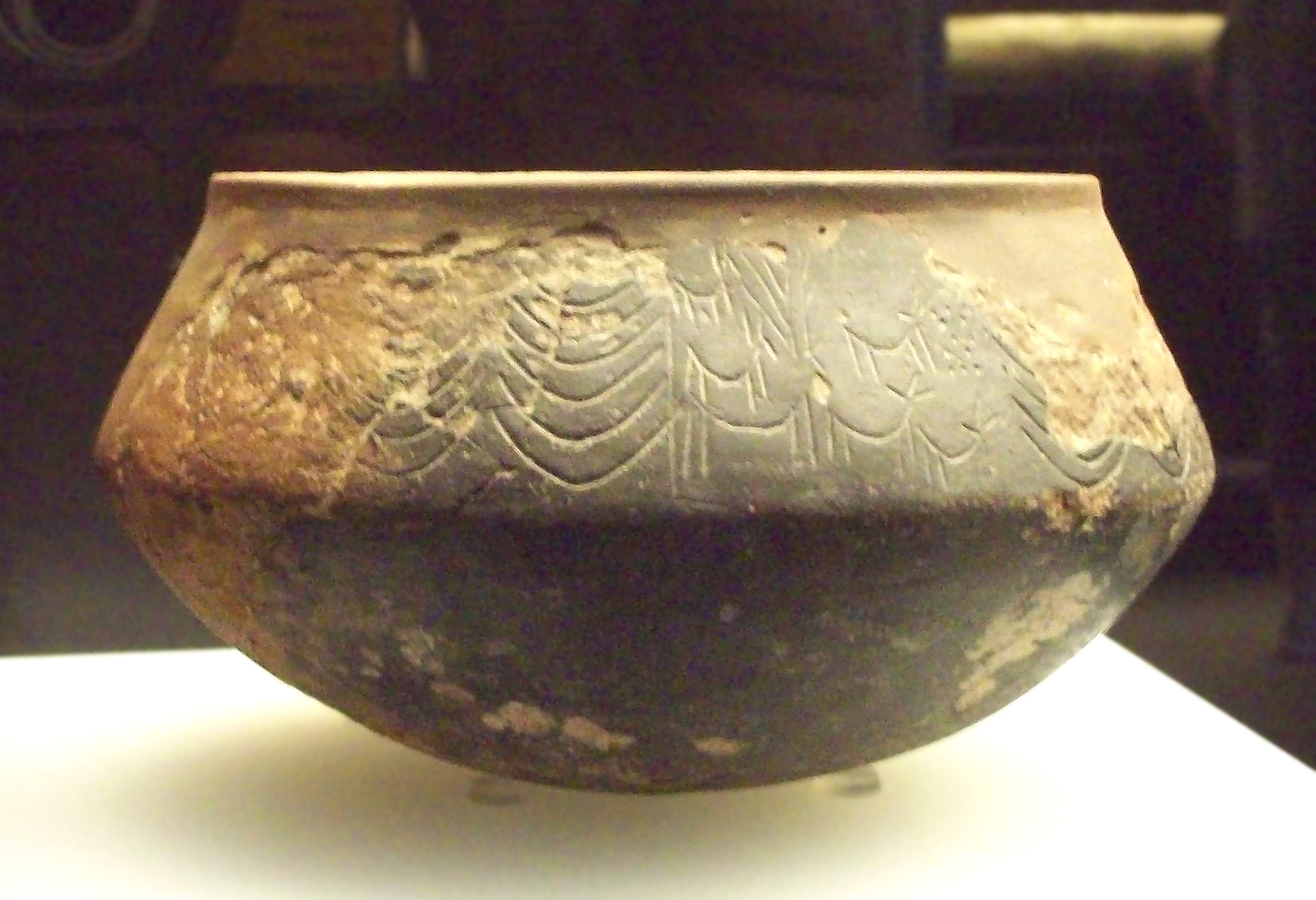

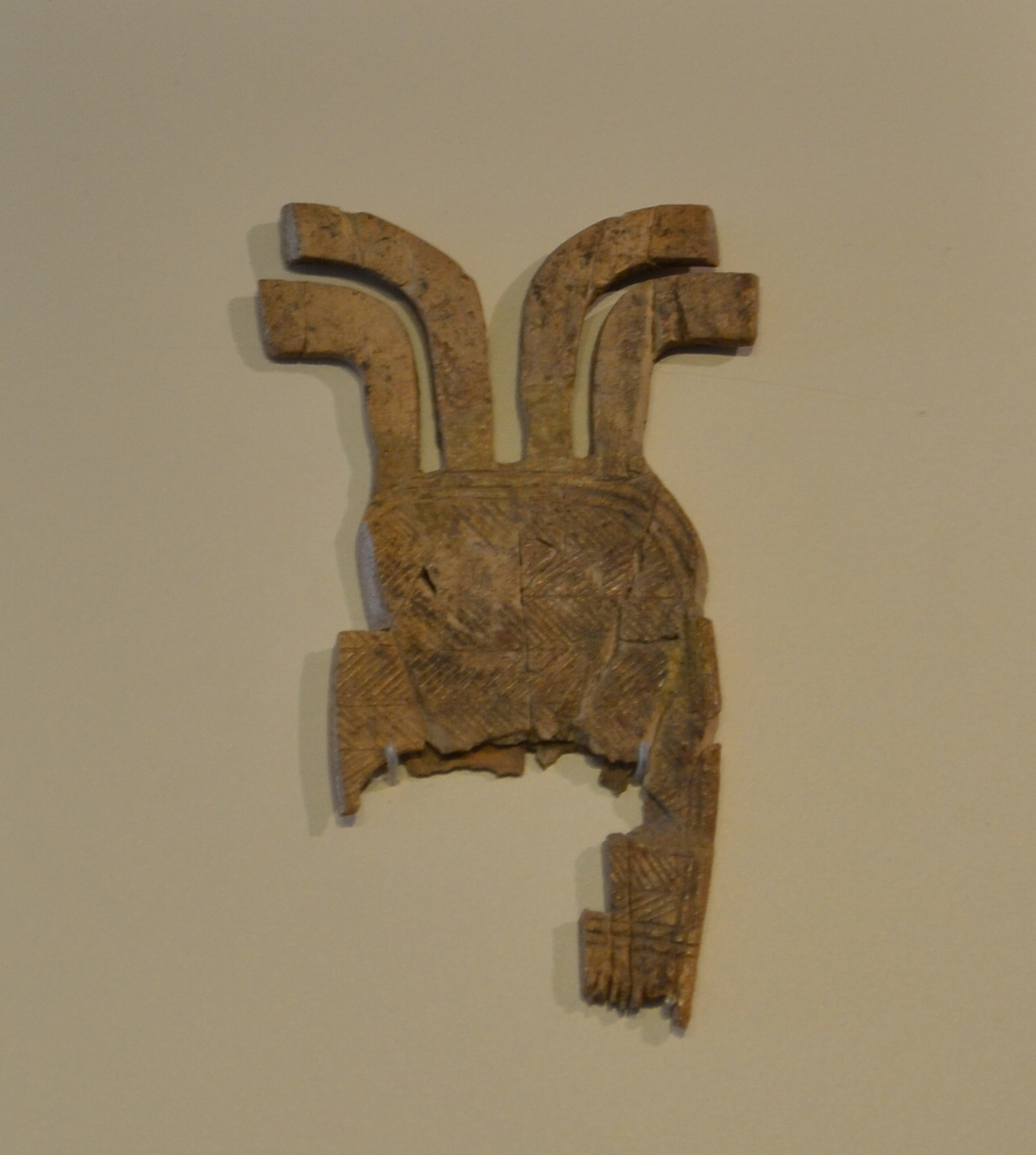

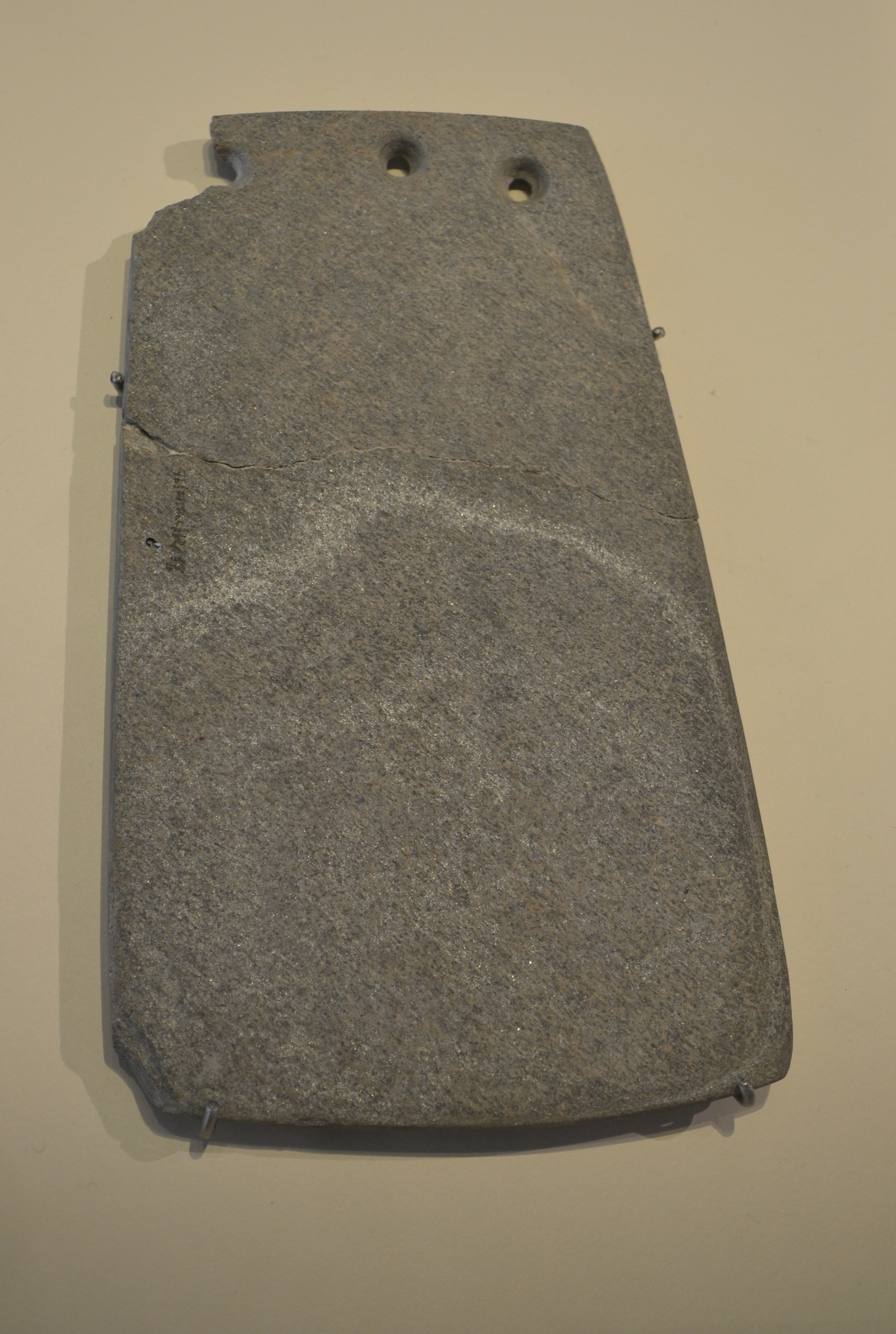

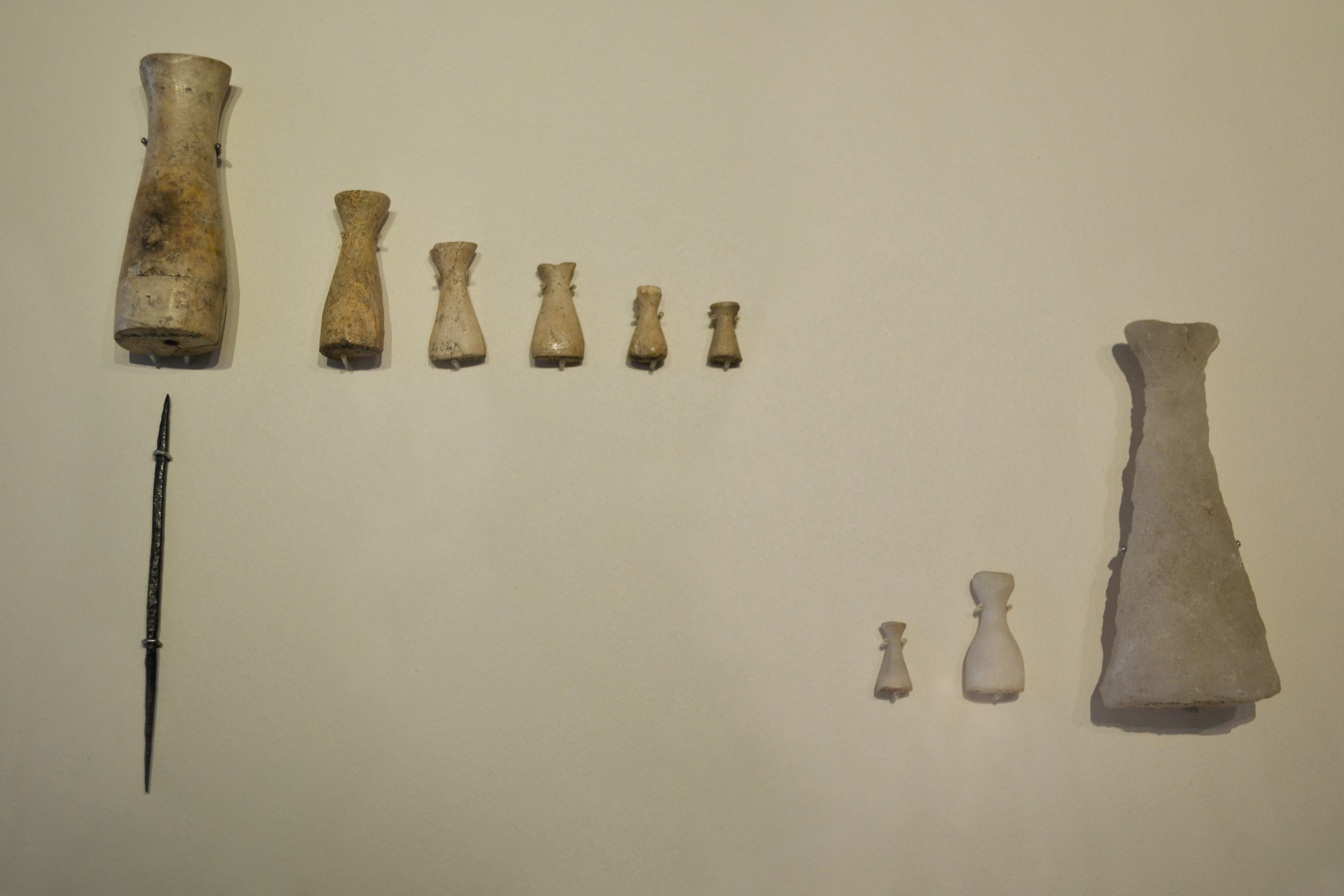

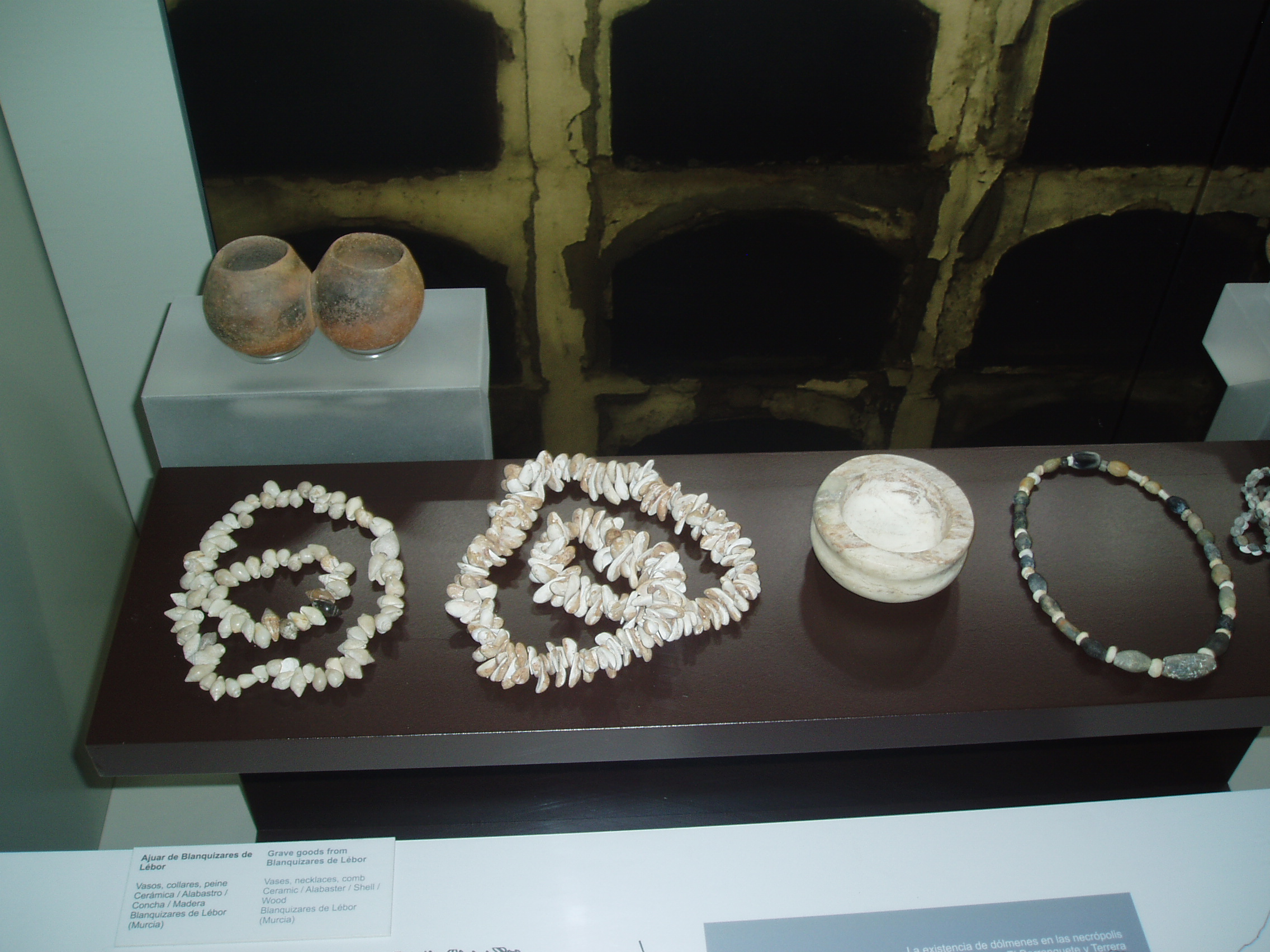

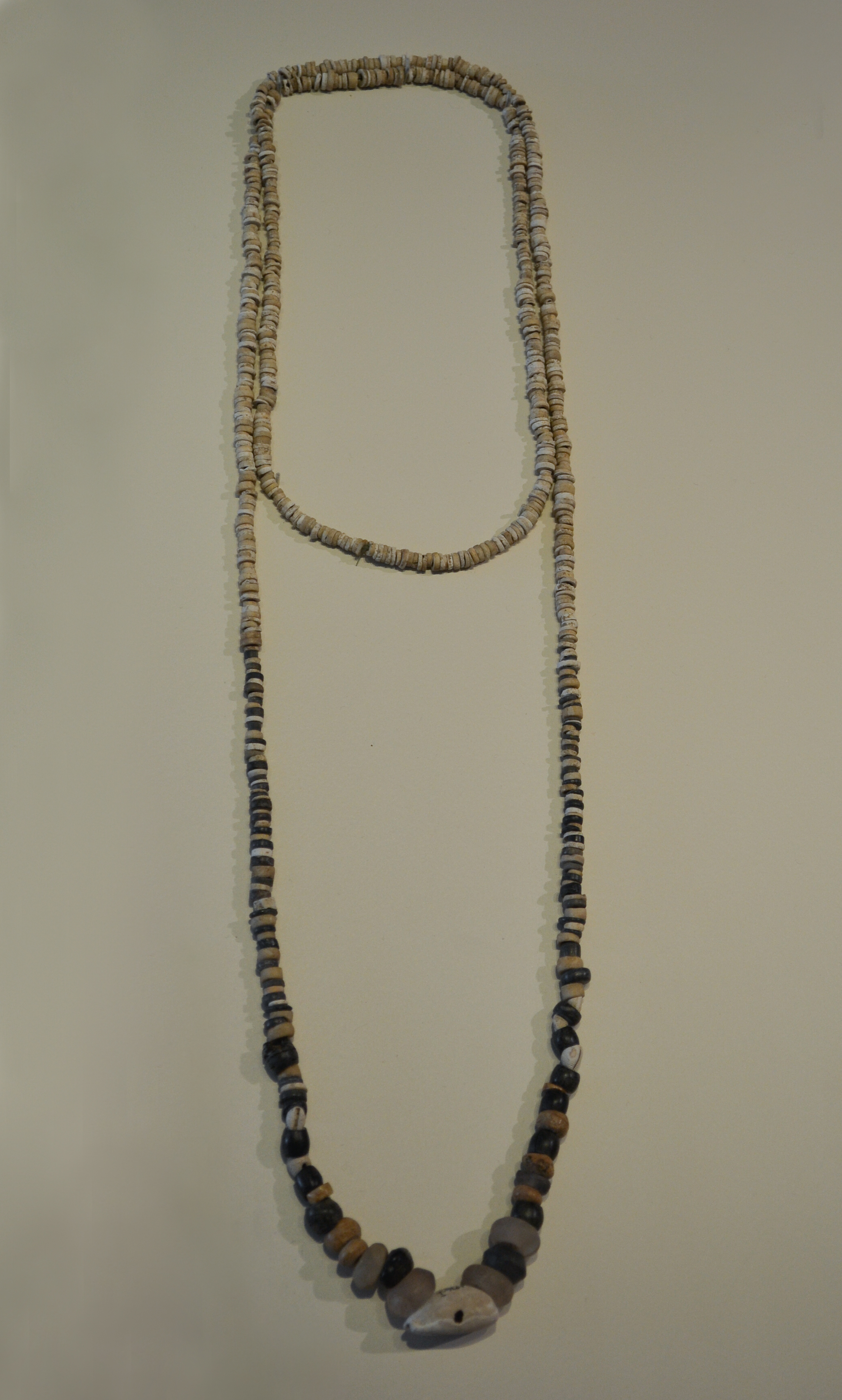

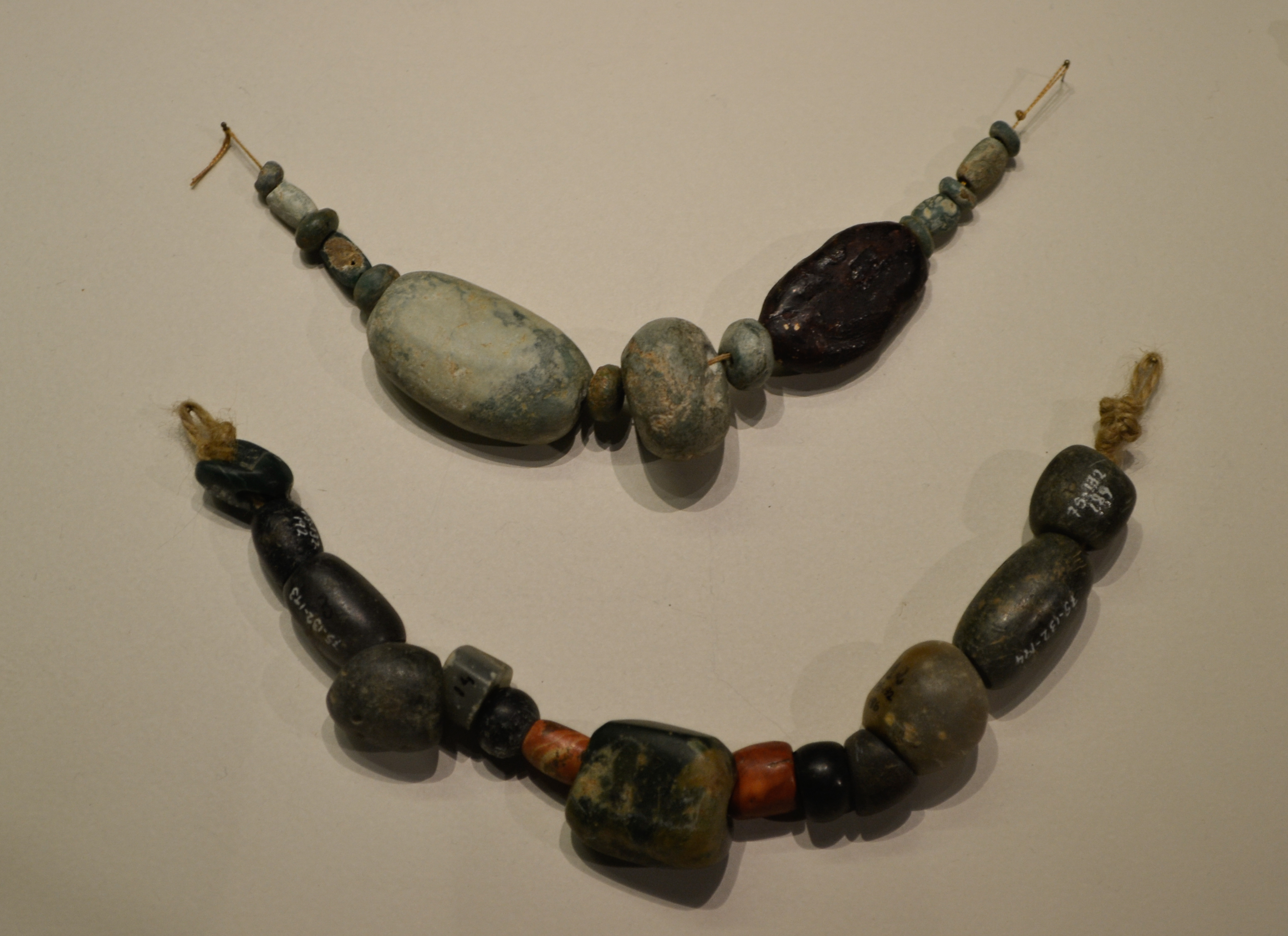

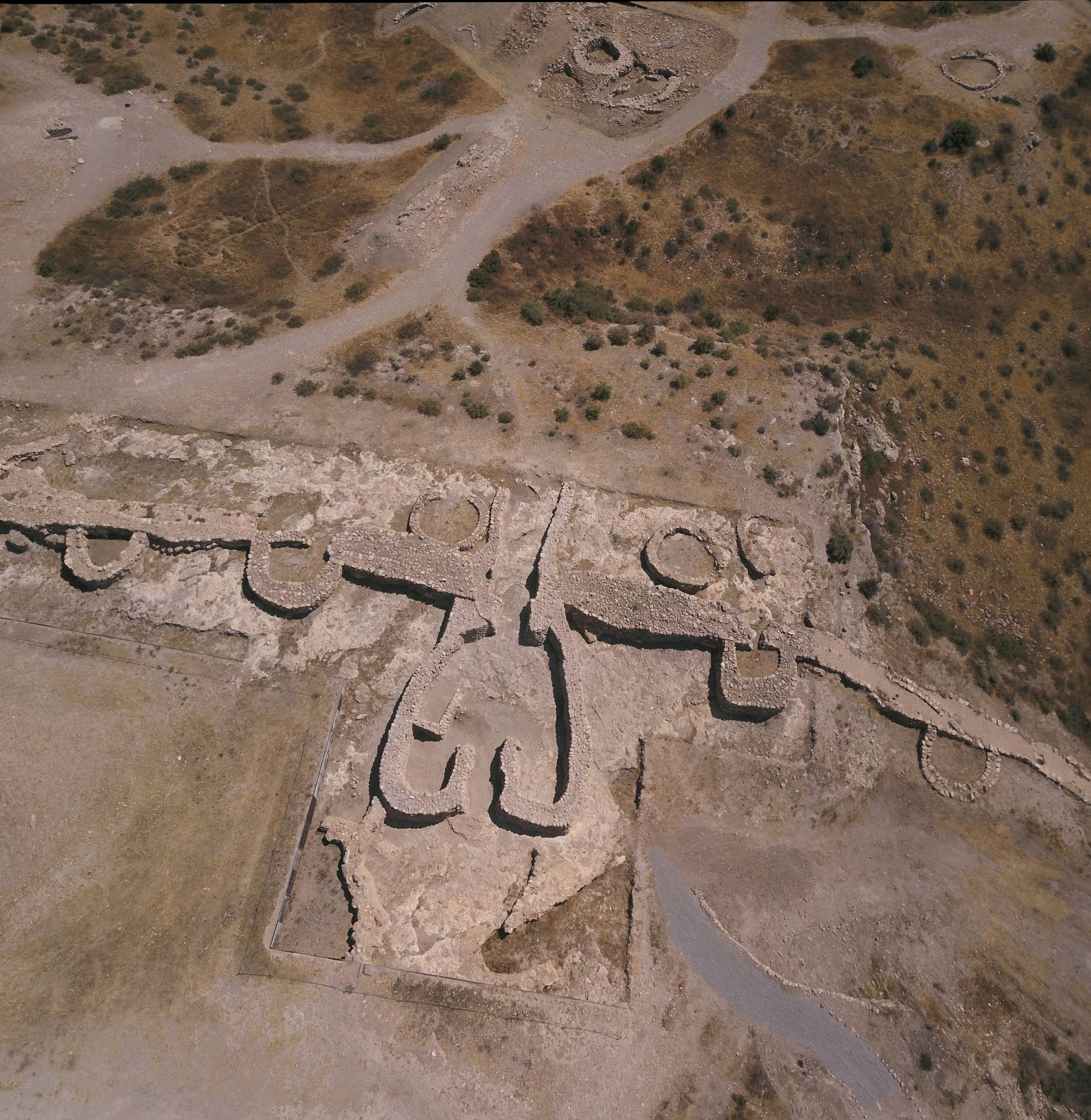
Remains of fortification walls

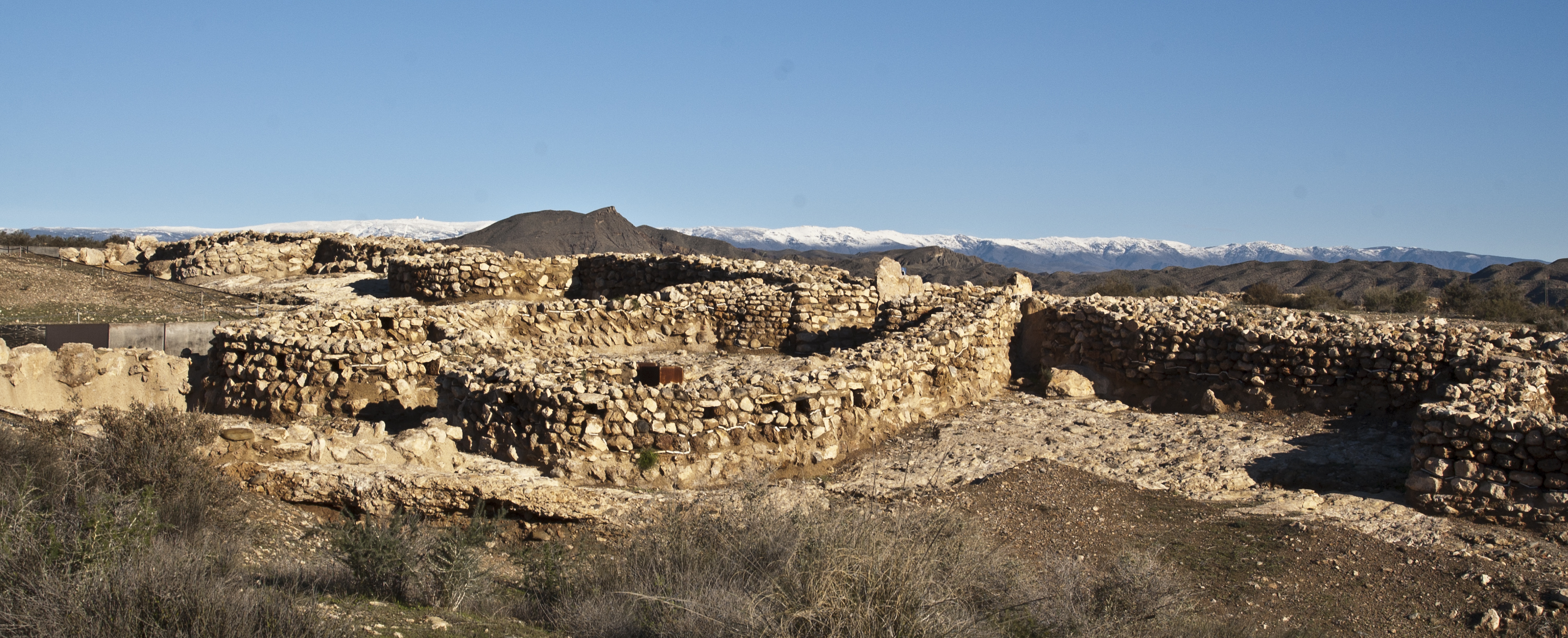
Remains of walls

== See also ==
- Bell Beaker culture
- Castro of Zambujal
- Castro of Vila Nova de São Pedro
- Valencina de la Concepción
- Tholos de El Romeral
- Prehistoric Europe
- Chalcolithic Europe
- Argaric culture
- Megalith, including other European megalithic cultures
- Early and simple domes
