= La Mulería =

- Village
- Location within Province of Almería Location within Andalusia Location within Spain
- Coordinates: 37°17′4″N 1°47′29″W
- Country: Spain
- Autonomous community: Andalusia
- Province: Province of Almería
- Municipality: Cuevas del Almanzora
- Elevation: 32 m (105 ft)

Population
  - Total: 140

La Mulería is a village located in the municipality of Cuevas del Almanzora, in Almería province, Andalusia, Spain. As of 2020, the population of the village was 140.

== Geography ==
La Mulería is located 87km northeast of Almería.
