= El Tarahal =

- Village
- El Molino del Tarahal
- Location within Province of Almería Location within Andalusia Location within Spain
- Coordinates: 37°18′55″N 1°46′1″W
- Country: Spain
- Autonomous community: Andalusia
- Province: Province of Almería
- Municipality: Cuevas del Almanzora
- Elevation: 74 m (243 ft)

Population
  - Total: 14

El Tarahal or El Molino del Tarahal is a village located in the municipality of Cuevas del Almanzora, in Almería province, Andalusia, Spain. As of 2020, it has a population of 14.

== Geography ==
El Tarahal is located 88km northeast of Almería.
