= Villaricos =

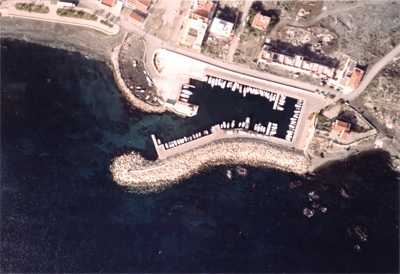
- Port
- Interactive map of Villaricos
- Coordinates: 37°14′57″N 1°46′16″W
- Region: Levante Almeriense
- Municipality: Cuevas del Almanzora

Area
  - Total: 63 km^{2} (24 sq mi)
- Elevation: 3 m (9.8 ft)

Population
  - Total: 626

Villaricos is a coastal district located in Cuevas del Almanzora, Spain. On 5 April 1863 the barque Candahar was driven ashore at Villaricos and broke in two. By 2018 it has 626 inhabitants, 335 men and 291 women.

Baria, an ancient Punic and later (since 209 BC) Roman city, was found in Villaricos.
