= Symbolkeramik =

Type of ancient pottery

Symbolkeramik is a name given by archaeologists to a type of pottery found at settlements from the Spanish Chalcolithic and early Bronze Age such as the site of Los Millares.

The pottery is characterized by the use of highly-stylized designs, including the oculus motif. Another example of these stylized designs are found in Morbihan, France, on the Carnac megaliths.
