= Guazamara =

- Village
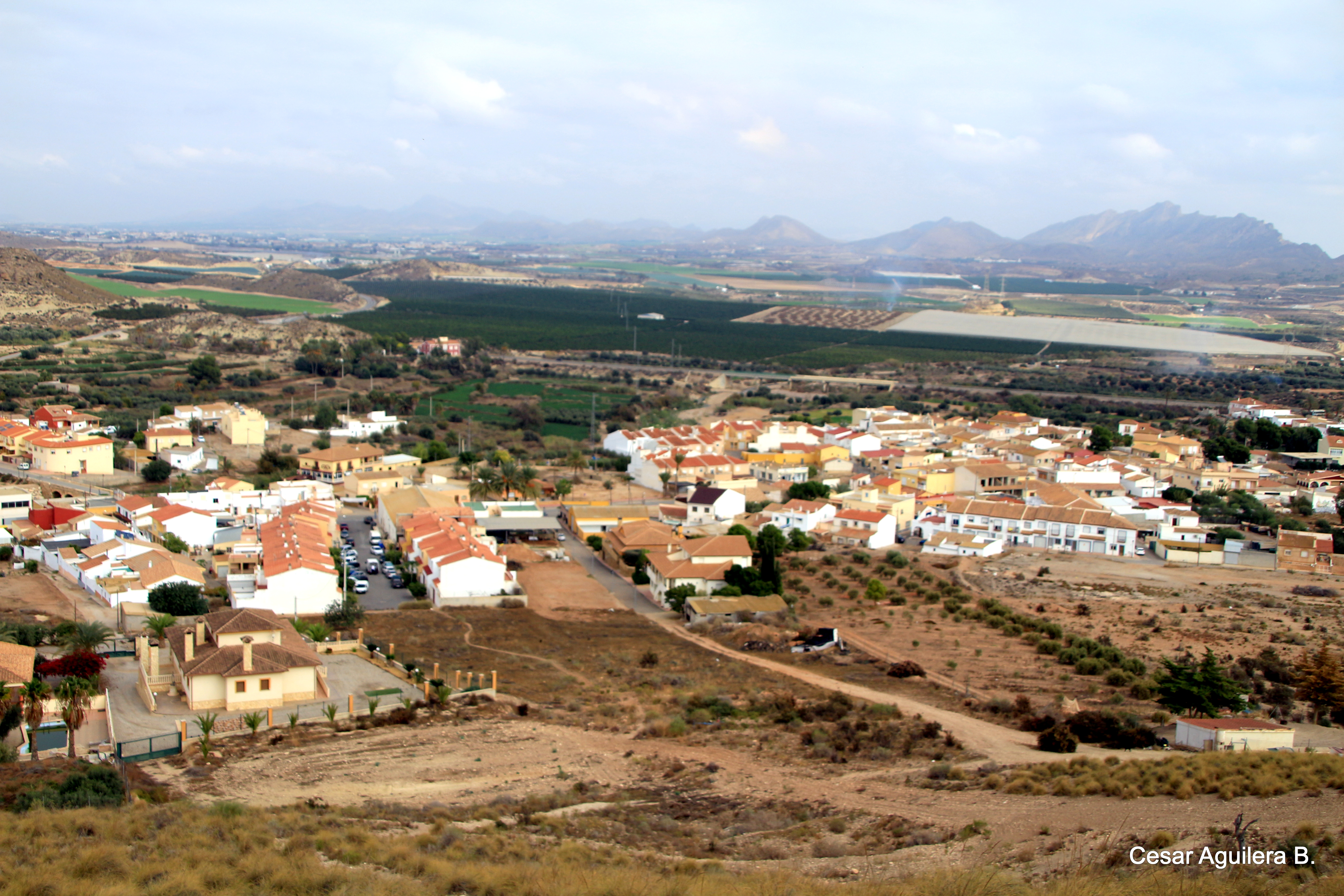

- Location within Province of Almería Location within Andalusia Location within Spain
- Coordinates: 37°20′50″N 1°46′43″W
- Country: Spain
- Autonomous community: Andalusia
- Province: Province of Almería
- Municipality: Cuevas del Almanzora
- Elevation: 142 m (466 ft)

Population
  - Total: 597

Guazamara is a village located in the municipality of Cuevas del Almanzora, in Almería province, Andalusia, Spain. As of 2020, it has a population of 597.

== Geography ==
Guazamara is located 92km northeast of Almería.
