= Cuevas del Almanzora =

Cuevas del Almanzora, Spain
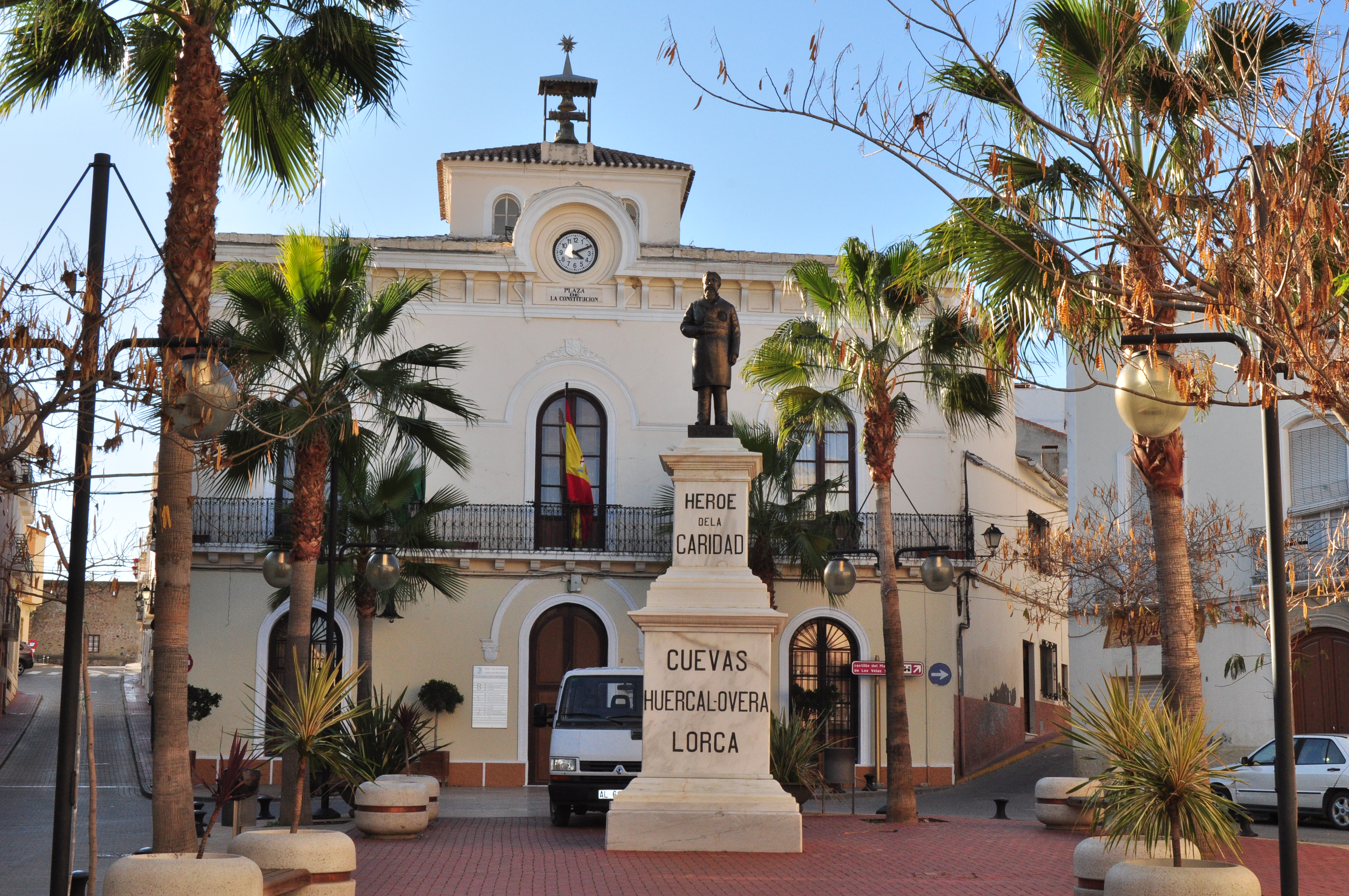
- Town hall

- Coat of arms
- Interactive map of Cuevas del Almanzora, Spain
- Coordinates: 37°18′N 1°52′W
- Municipality: Almería

Government
  - Mayor: Antonio Fernández Liria (PSOE)

Area
  - Total: 263.76 km^{2} (101.84 sq mi)
- Elevation: 88 m (289 ft)

Population (2025-01-01)
  - Total: 15,526
  - Density: 58.864/km^{2} (152.46/sq mi)
- Time zone: UTC+1 (CET)
  - Summer (DST): UTC+2 (CEST)
- Website: cuevasdelalmanzora.es

Cuevas del Almanzora is a municipality of Almería province, in the autonomous community of Andalusia, Spain.

== Villages ==
- Alhanchete
- Aljarilla
- Barrio Bravo
- Burjulú
- Cala Panizo
- El Calguerín (also known as Cuevas de Vera)
- El Calón
- El Largo
- El Martinete
- El Morro
- El Realengo
- El Rulador
- El Tarahal
- El Piojo
- Grima
- Guazamara
- Jucainí
- La Algarrobina
- La Mulería
- La Portilla
- Las Canalejas
- Las Cunas
- Las Cupillas
- Los Guiraos
- Las Herrerías
- Los Lobos
- Palomares
- Pozo del Esparto
- Villaricos
- Vizcaíno
- Zutija

== Demographics ==
Historical population
Year	Pop.	±%
1999	9,584	—
2000	9,645	+0.6%
2001	10,155	+5.3%
2002	10,425	+2.7%
2003	10,695	+2.6%
2004	11,001	+2.9%
2005	11,484	+4.4%
2017	13,655	+18.9%
2018	13,776	+0.9%
Source: INE (Spain)

demographic vertical bar chart of Cuevas del almanzora between 1900 and 2017
Population according to the census.
Population according to the padrón municipal.

== See also ==
- List of municipalities in Almería
- 1966 Palomares B-52 crash
