= Las Herrerías, Cuevas del Almanzora =

Las Herrerías
- Village
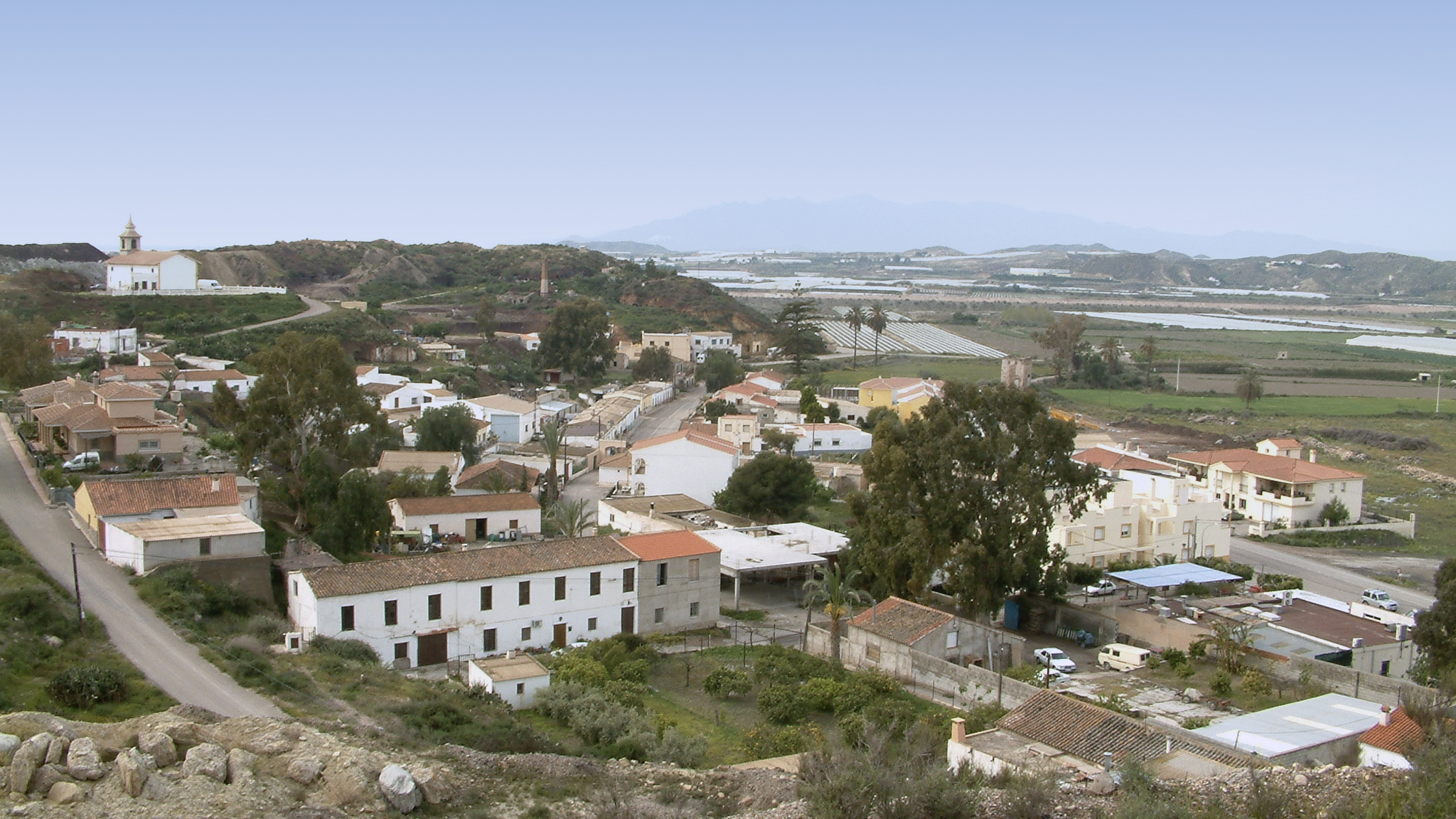

- Location within Province of Almería Location within Andalusia Location within Spain
- Coordinates: 37°16′15″N 1°47′46″W
- Country: Spain
- Autonomous community: Andalusia
- Province: Province of Almería
- Municipality: Cuevas del Almanzora
- Elevation: 25 m (82 ft)

Population
  - Total: 275

Las Herrerías is a village located in the municipality of Cuevas del Almanzora, in Almería province, Andalusia, Spain. As of 2020, it has a population of 275.

== Geography ==
Las Herrerías is located 89km northeast of Almería.
