= Santa Fe de Mondújar =

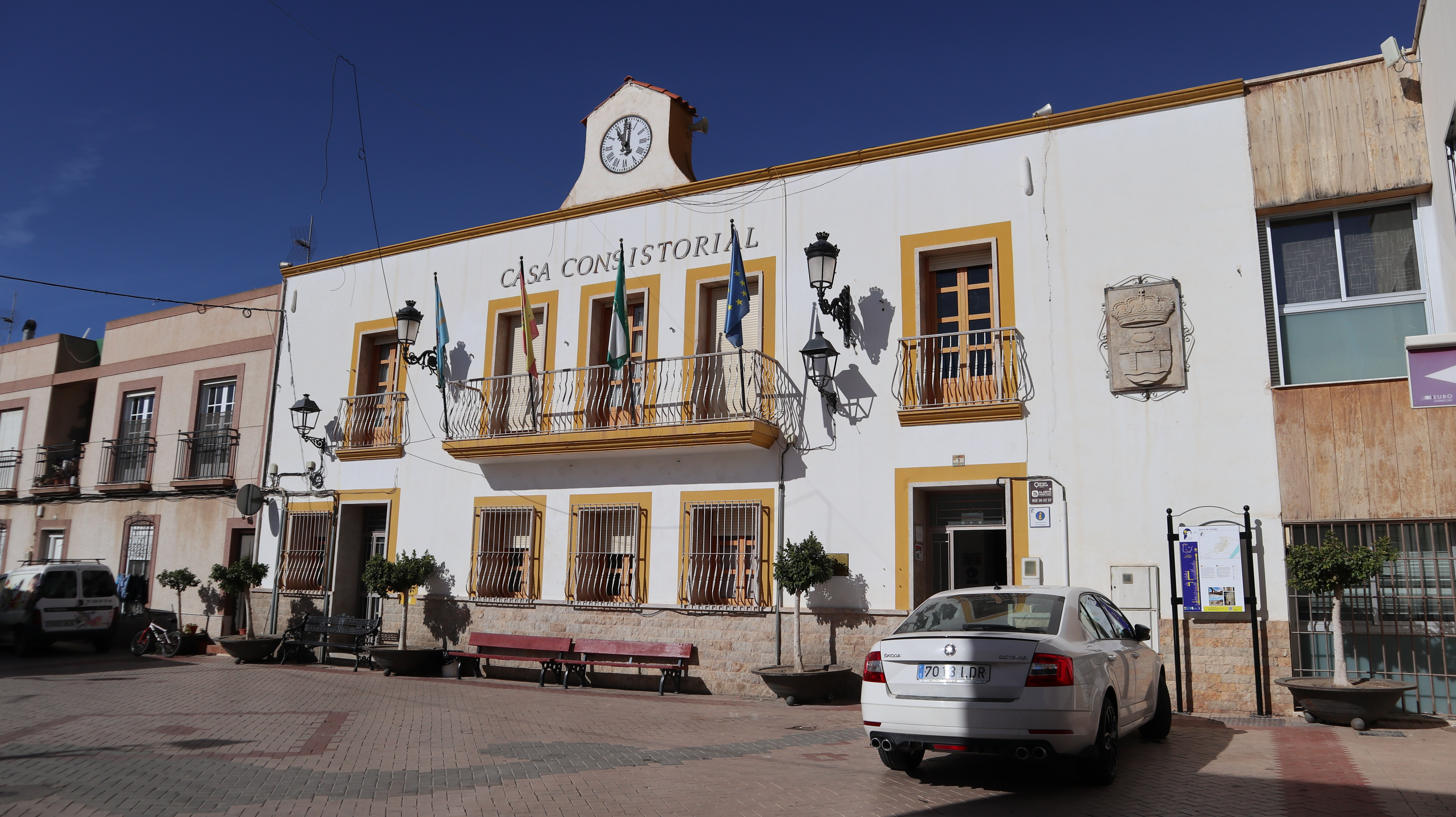
- Town hall

- Flag Coat of arms

- Location within Spain
- Coordinates: 36°58′N 2°31′W
- Country: Spain
- Community: Andalusia
- Municipality: Almería

Government
  - Mayor: Trinidad Góngora Escámez (PSOE)

Area
  - Total: 35 km^{2} (14 sq mi)
- Elevation: 233 m (764 ft)

Population (2025-01-01)
  - Total: 503
  - Density: 14/km^{2} (37/sq mi)
- Time zone: UTC+1 (CET)
  - Summer (DST): UTC+2 (CEST)

Santa Fe de Mondújar is a municipality of the Province of Almería, in the autonomous community of Andalusia, Spain.

== Demographics ==
Historical population
Year	Pop.	±%
1999	414	—
2000	473	+14.3%
2001	458	−3.2%
2002	456	−0.4%
2003	437	−4.2%
2004	433	−0.9%
2005	437	+0.9%
Source: INE (Spain)

== See also ==
- List of municipalities in Almería
