= Forts of Serra da Aguieira =

19th-century forts in Portugal

- Lisbon District, Near Vila Franca de Xira in Portugal
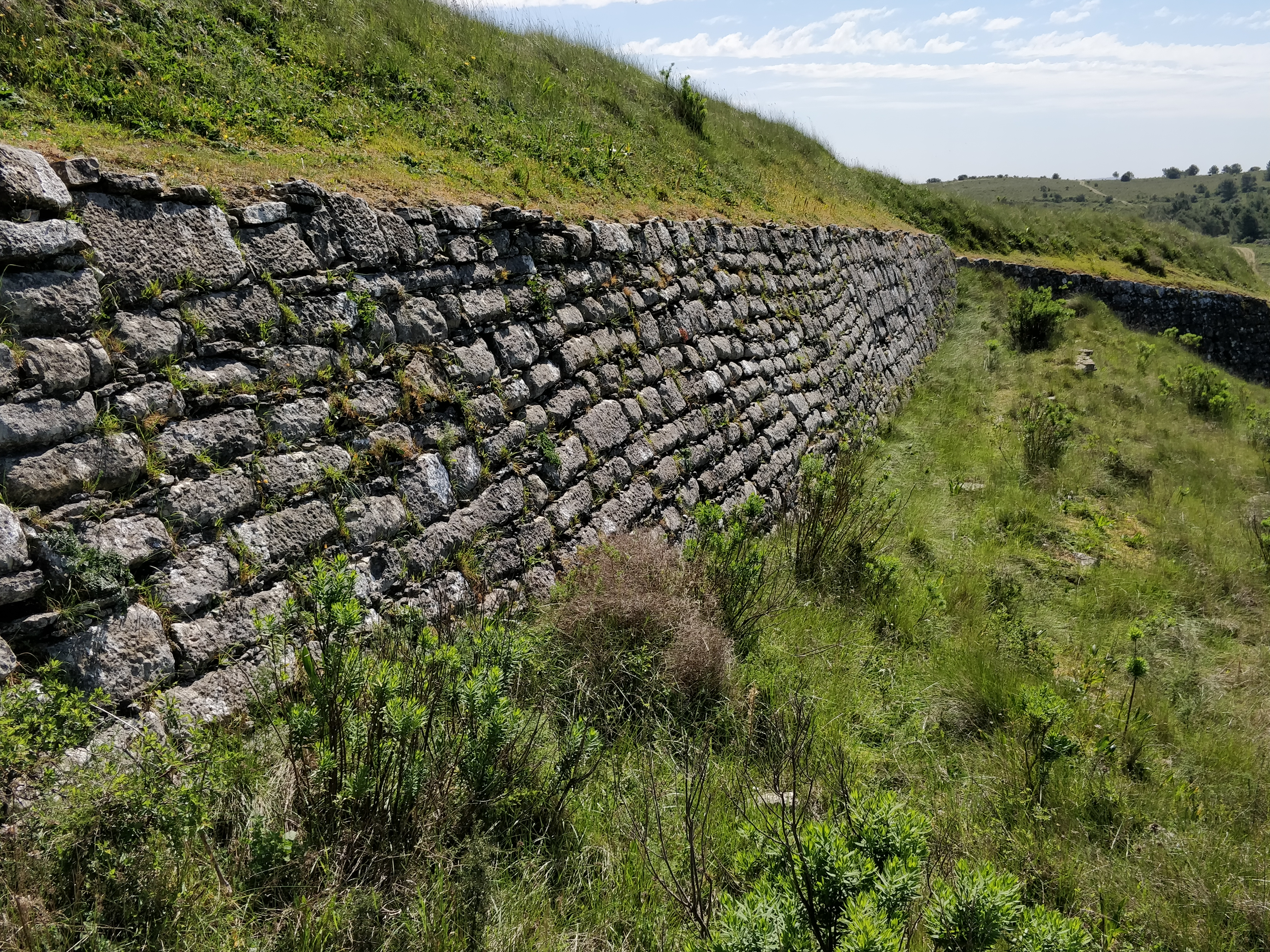
- Wall of the Fort of Portela Grande

Site information
- Type: Fort
- Open to the public: Yes.
- Condition: Preserved and partly restored.

Location
- Coordinates: 38°53′59″N 9°04′19″W

Site history
- Built: 1810
- Built by: Duke of Wellington
- Fate: Unused in battle

The Forts of Serra da Aguieira (Hills of Aguieira) were three forts constructed within 100 metres of each other as part of the second line of defence of the Lines of Torres Vedras, which were constructed by Anglo-Portuguese forces in 1810 in order to protect the Portuguese capital Lisbon from possible invasion by the French during the Peninsular War. The forts are situated in the municipality of Vila Franca de Xira, in the Lisbon District of Portugal. From north to south the three forts are the Fort of Aguieira, the Fort of Portela Grande, and the Fort of Portela Pequena.

== History ==
Following the Treaty of Fontainebleau signed between France and Spain in October 1807, which provided for the invasion of Portugal, French troops under the command of General Junot entered Portugal, leading to a Portuguese request for support from the British. In July 1808 troops commanded by the Duke of Wellington, at the time known as Arthur Wellesley, defeated French troops at the Battles of Roliça and Vimeiro. This forced Junot to negotiate the Convention of Cintra, which led to the evacuation of the French army from Portugal. In March 1809, Marshal Soult led a new French expedition that advanced south to the city of Porto before being repulsed by Portuguese-British troops and forced to withdraw.

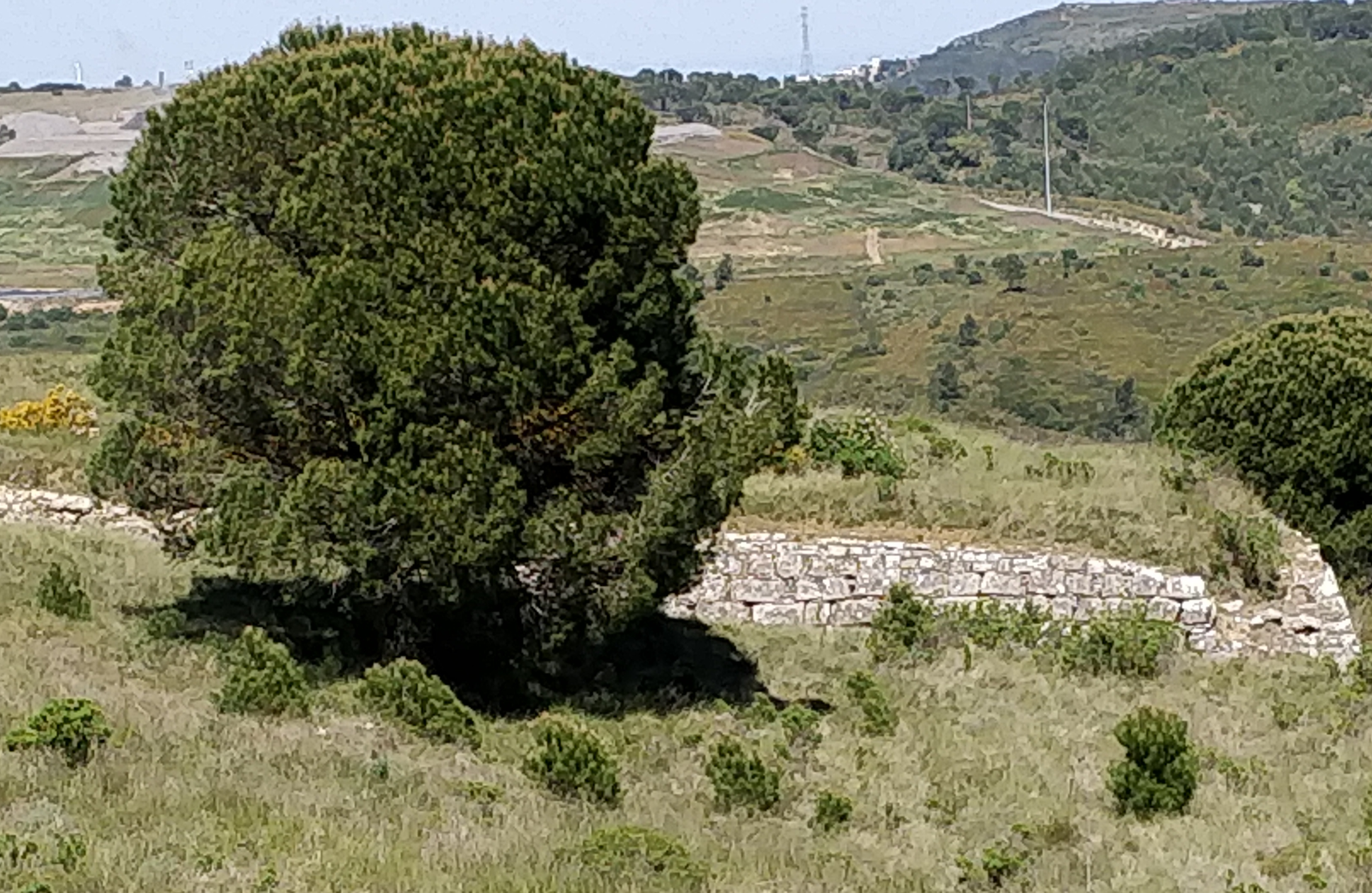
View of the Fort of Aguieira from the Fort of Portela Grande

The threat of a further invasions by the French led Wellington, on October 20, 1809, to order the secret construction of defensive lines in order to protect Lisbon from Napoléon Bonaparte's troops led by Marechal Masséna. A total of 152 military installations were constructed, armed with 534 cannon and garrisoned with about 34,000 troops. Each work was given a number and the three forts discussed here were Numbers 40-42. They were built at the top of the Aguieira mountain range, providing excellent views of the surrounding area and of the River Tagus.

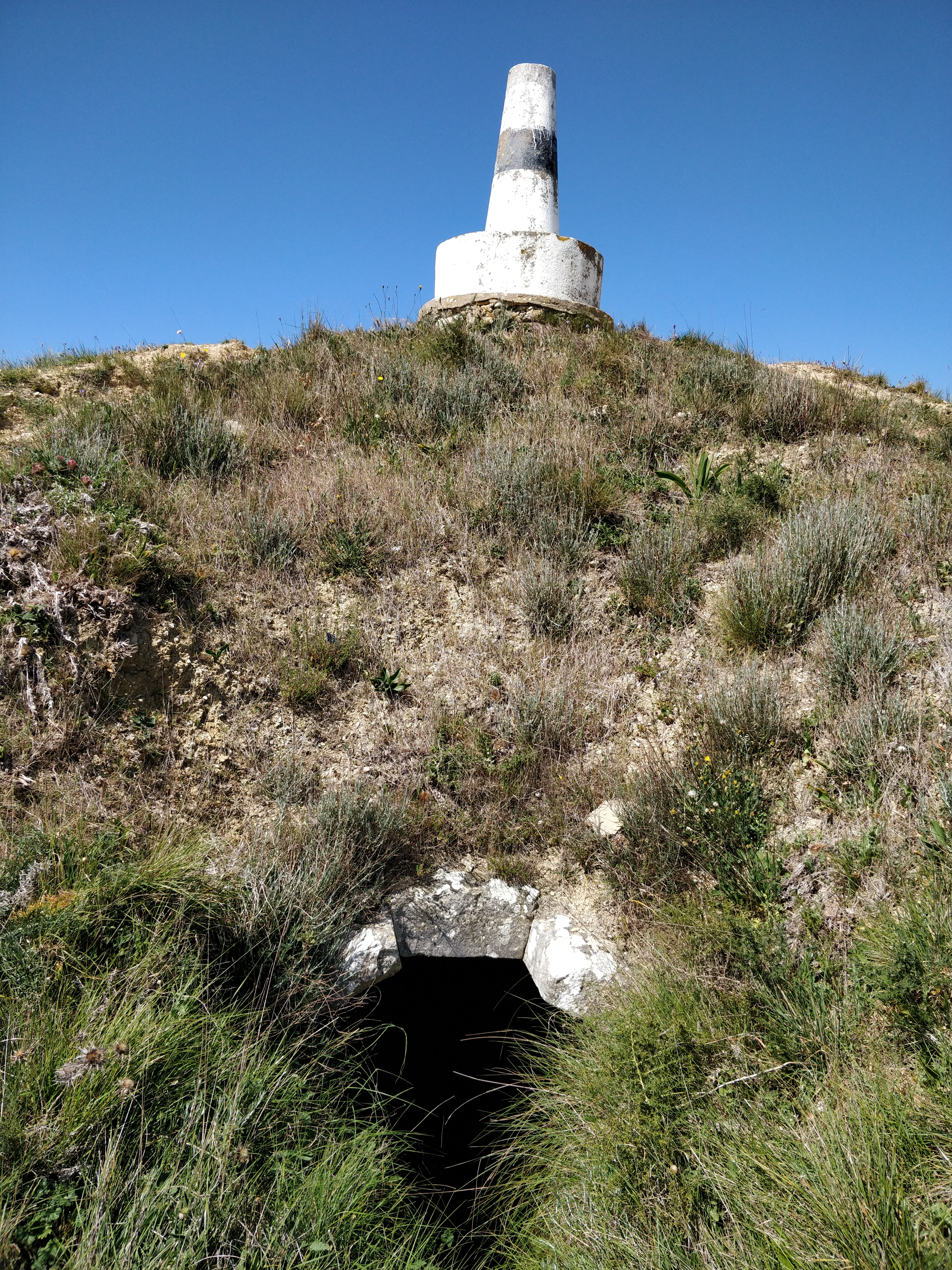
View of the entrance to the magazine of the Fort of Portela Grande. The fort is now topped by a survey marker

== Fort of Aguieira ==
Construction of this fort (Number 40) began in February 1810, following an irregular star-shaped design, and was completed before October. It is situated at an altitude of 280 metres. The fort was not fitted with cannon: instead it was garrisoned with 150 soldiers whose main task was to protect the other two forts and cover surrounding roads.

== Fort of Portela Grande ==
Fort Number 41 was constructed at the same time as the Fort of Aguieira and had a garrison of 240 men. It supported defences along the Tagus, providing fire to the west, as well as to the east in order to provide cover for the Fort of Casa, which was lower down and closer to the river. Portela Grande dominated the Bucelas gorge and it could also exchange crossfire with the Fort of Arpim to the north-northwest. At an altitude of 274 metres the fort of Portela Grande was built as an irregular 11-sided polygon surrounded by a dry moat, with gun emplacements. It had five cannon. As with Portela Pequena, the Fort of Portela Grande had a stone-lined magazine, which was unusual in the Lines of Torres Vedras where most of the magazines were wood lined. The fort is now topped by a survey marker.

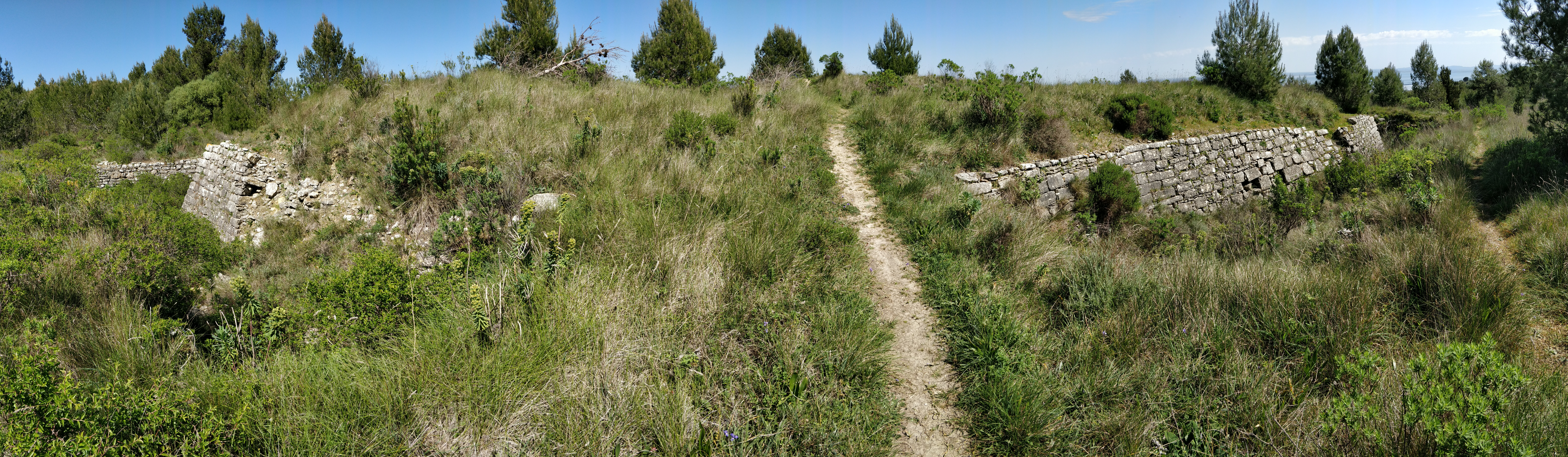
A wide-angled view of the Fort of Portela Pequena

== Fort of Portela Pequena ==
The Fort of Portela Pequena is a short walk from the Fort of Portela Grande and had similar objectives to cover possible invasion along roads and the River Tagus. “Pequena” means “small” in Portuguese but, with 350 troops, this fort (Number 42) had a garrison larger than the “large” fort. It had six cannon. Like Portela Grande it had a dry moat protected by escarpments.

== See also ==
- List of forts of the Lines of Torres Vedras
