= Fort of Mosqueiro =

19th-century fort in Portugal

- Reduto do Mosqueiro
- Lisbon District, Near Bucelas in Portugal
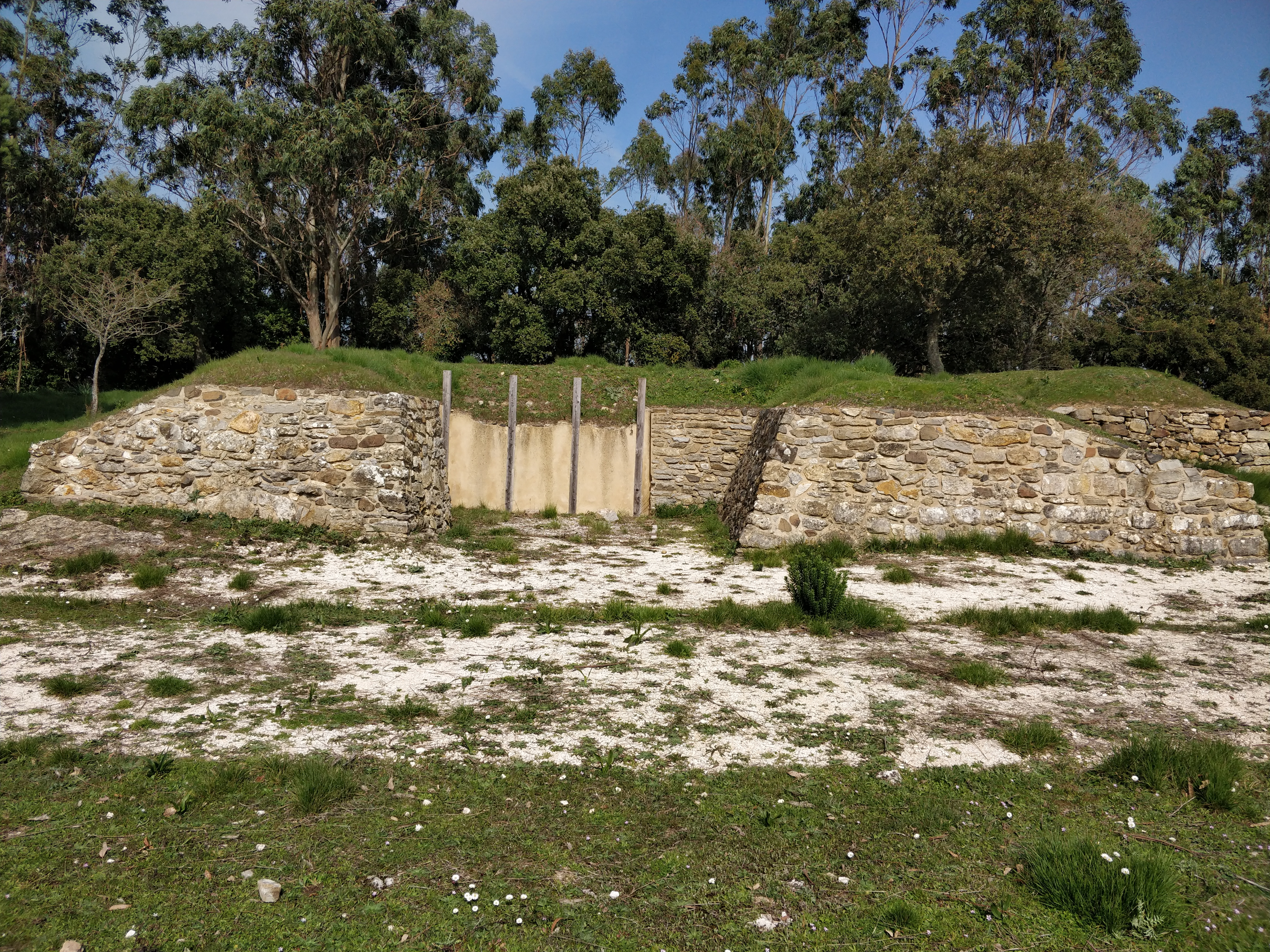
- Mosqueiro Fort

Site information
- Type: Fort/Redoubt
- Operator: Unoccupied
- Open to the public: Yes

Location
- Coordinates: 38°53′56″N 9°10′57″W

Site history
- Built: 1809-10
- Built by: Duke of Wellington
- Fate: Preserved

Garrison information
- Garrison: 270

The Fort of Mosqueiro, also known as the Redoubt of Mosqueiro (Portuguese: Reduto do Mosqueiro), is one of a group of fortifications in Portugal that made up the Lines of Torres Vedras, which were designed to protect the capital, Lisbon, from possible invasion by French troops during the Peninsular War. It is situated near Bucelas in the Loures municipality in the Lisbon District of Portugal.

== History ==
The threat of invasion of Portugal by the French during the Peninsular War (1807–14) led to the construction of the Lines of Torres Vedras in late 1809 and 1810, in order to protect Lisbon from Napoléon Bonaparte's troops. Consisting of 152 forts and redoubts forming three lines of defence, the construction was ordered by the British commander, the Duke of Wellington, after two French invasions had already been repelled. By so doing he was also seeking to protect his own retreat and possible evacuation if overwhelmed by French forces. The first line of defence of the Lines of Torres Vedras successfully repelled the French and the Mosqueiro fort never saw battle.

== Description ==
Situated on the Ribas escarpment on a basalt hill, the Mosqueiro fort was built at an altitude of 332 metres and was designed for a garrison of 270 soldiers in order to control access along the Montachique, Ribas and São Gião gorges. It was work number 52 of the Lines and is believed to have had three cannon. In addition to having a commanding view of the gorges, it was close to, and had a good view of, the Fort of Ribas (also known as the Redoubt of Freixial) on the same escarpment. The fort included a magazine, gun emplacements, and an inner square for assembling troops, and was protected by palisades and a dry moat.

== Present day ==
In March 2012, the Municipality of Loures inaugurated a Centre of Interpretation of the Lines of Torres. It is attached to the Wine Museum in Bucelas and has the objective of making known to visitors the whole history of the fortifications built during the French invasions, particularly in the Bucelas area.

== See also ==
- List of forts of the Lines of Torres Vedras
