= Forts of Ajuda =

19th-century forts in Portugal

- Lisbon District, Near Bucelas in Portugal
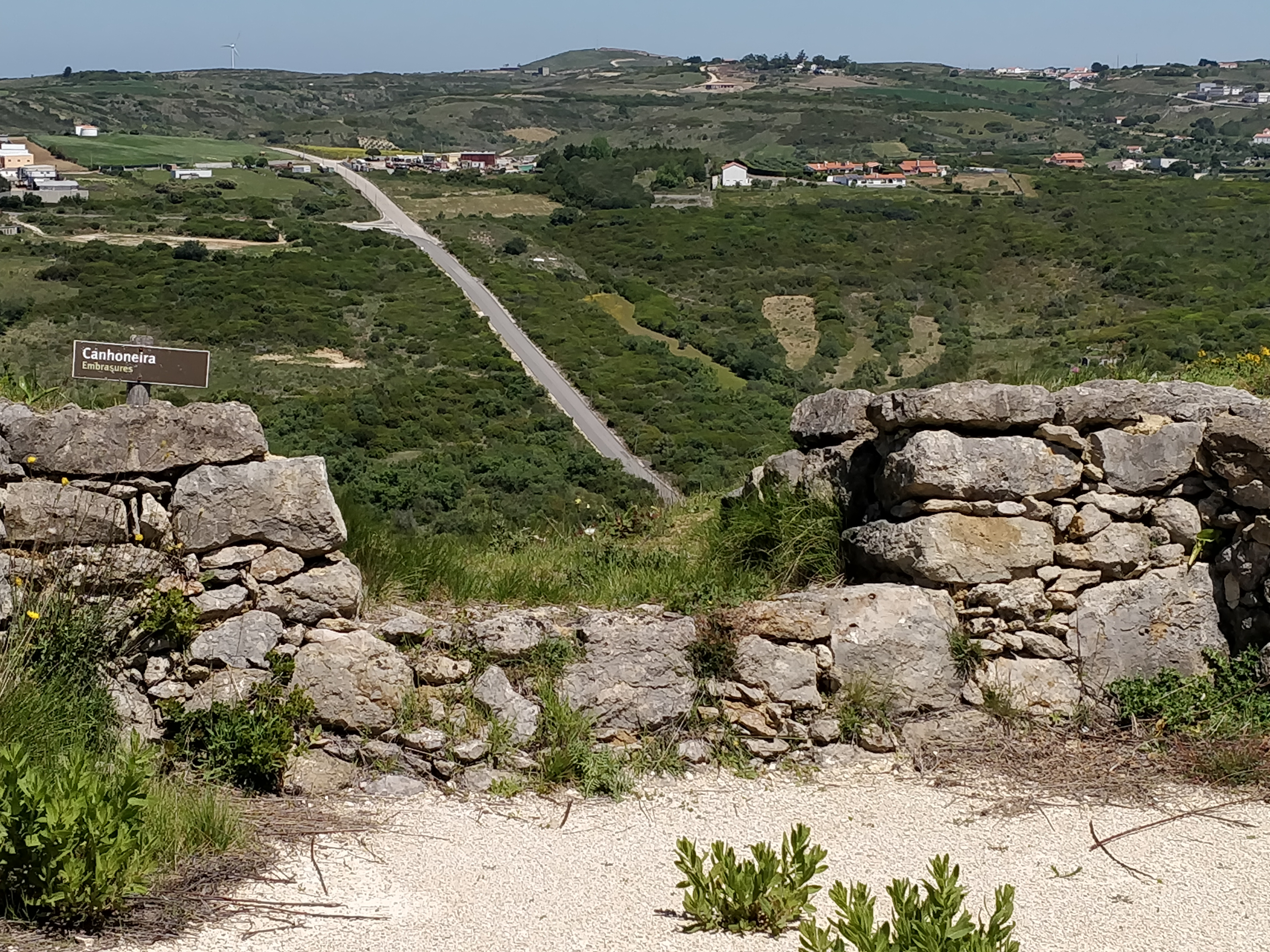
- Fort of Ajuda Grande

Site information
- Type: Fort
- Open to the public: Yes.
- Condition: Partly restored.

Location
- Coordinates: 38°56′19″N 9°07′46″W

Site history
- Built: 1810
- Built by: Duke of Wellington
- Fate: Unused in battle

The Forts of Ajuda are located in the parish of Bucelas, in the municipality of Loures in the Lisbon District of Portugal. Just a short distance apart, the Forts of Ajuda Grande (Big) and Ajuda Pequeno (Small) were built in 1810 as part of the Lines of Torres Vedras, which were defensive lines to protect the Portuguese capital Lisbon from invasion by the French during the Peninsular War (1807–14).

== History ==
Following the Treaty of Fontainebleau signed between France and Spain in October 1807, which agreed on the invasion of Portugal, French troops under the command of General Junot entered the country, which requested support from the British. In July 1808 troops commanded by Arthur Wellesley, 1st Duke of Wellington landed in Portugal and defeated French troops at the Battles of Roliça and Vimeiro. This forced Junot to negotiate the Convention of Cintra, which led to the evacuation of the French army from Portugal. In March 1809, Marshal Soult led a new French expedition that advanced south to the city of Porto before being repulsed by Portuguese-British troops and forced to withdraw. However, the threat of further invasions by the French led Wellington, on October 20, 1809, to order the construction of defensive lines to the north of the capital, between the Atlantic Ocean and the River Tagus. The Lines of Torres Vedras, consisting of 152 forts, redoubts and other military installations, were built rapidly and in conditions of great secrecy, under the overall supervision of Colonel Richard Fletcher who was commander of the Royal Engineers.

The Forts of Ajuda were named after the nearby Sanctuary of Nossa Senhora da Ajuda (Our Lady of Help) and were built at the top of the Serra da Alrota hills on a limestone ridge that provides a panoramic view. They were part of the second line of defence, about 30 km north of Lisbon and 10 km south of the first line. The first line proved adequate to deter the French from attempting further advances and so the Ajuda forts never saw battle, although they continued to be used militarily for some time.

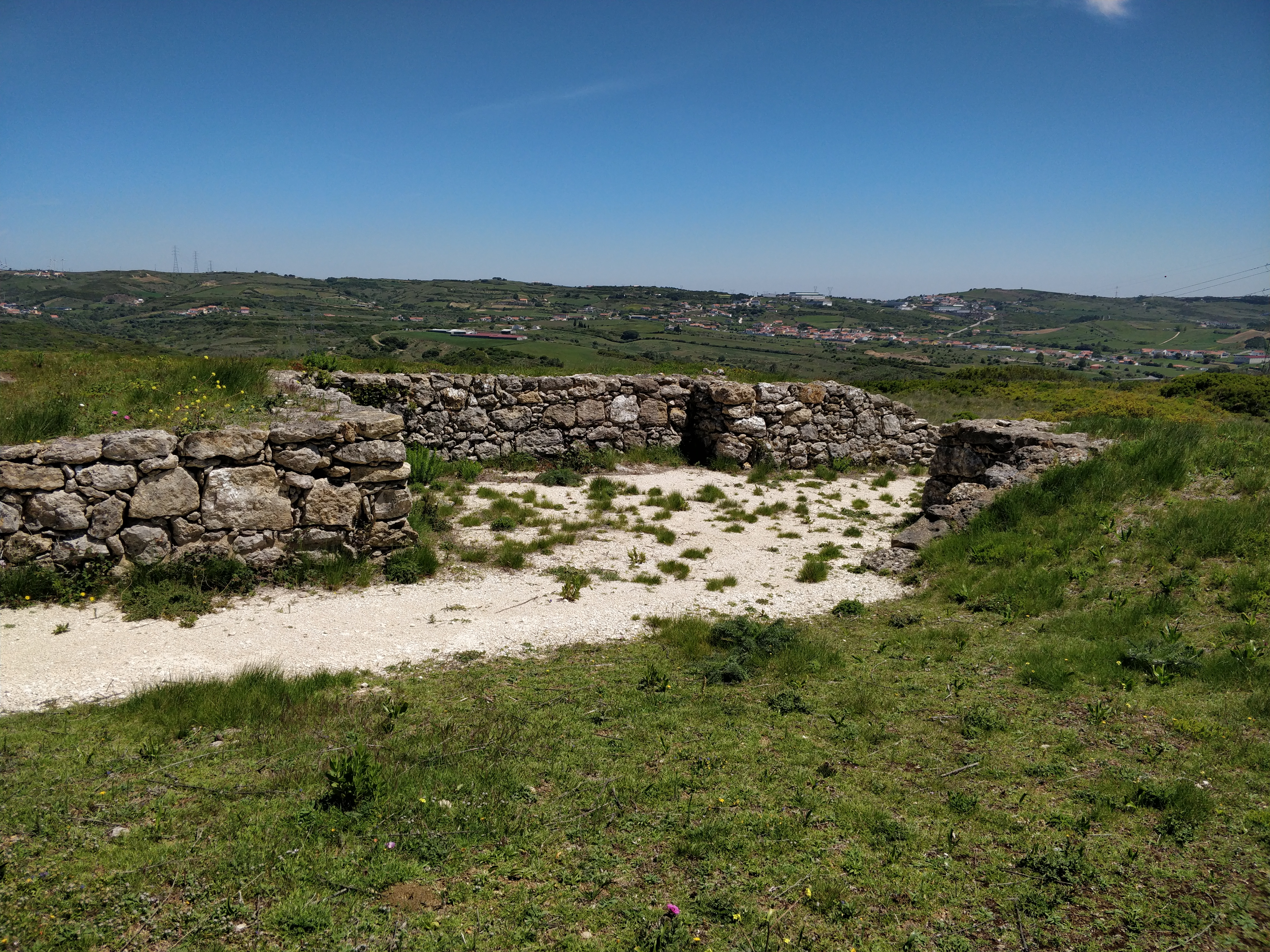
Fort of Ajuda Grande

=== Fort of Ajuda Grande ===
Built at an altitude of 311 metres, Ajuda Grande (also known as the Fort of Alrota) was planned to control the road that connected Sobral de Monte Agraço, where the French were repulsed, with Bucelas. It was built as an irregular polygon with eleven sides, with two connected bulwarks and with three access points, and is surrounded by a dry moat. Inside, there is a magazine, five embrasures and two traverses. The fort was designed for a garrison of 300 men and is believed to have had four 12-pounder cannon. All of the works on the Lines were numbered and Ajuda Grande was No. 18, forming part of District 5 of the second line. As part of the celebrations of the bicentennial of the Lines of Torres Vedras in 2010, the fort was recently restored. The site also contains a survey marker.

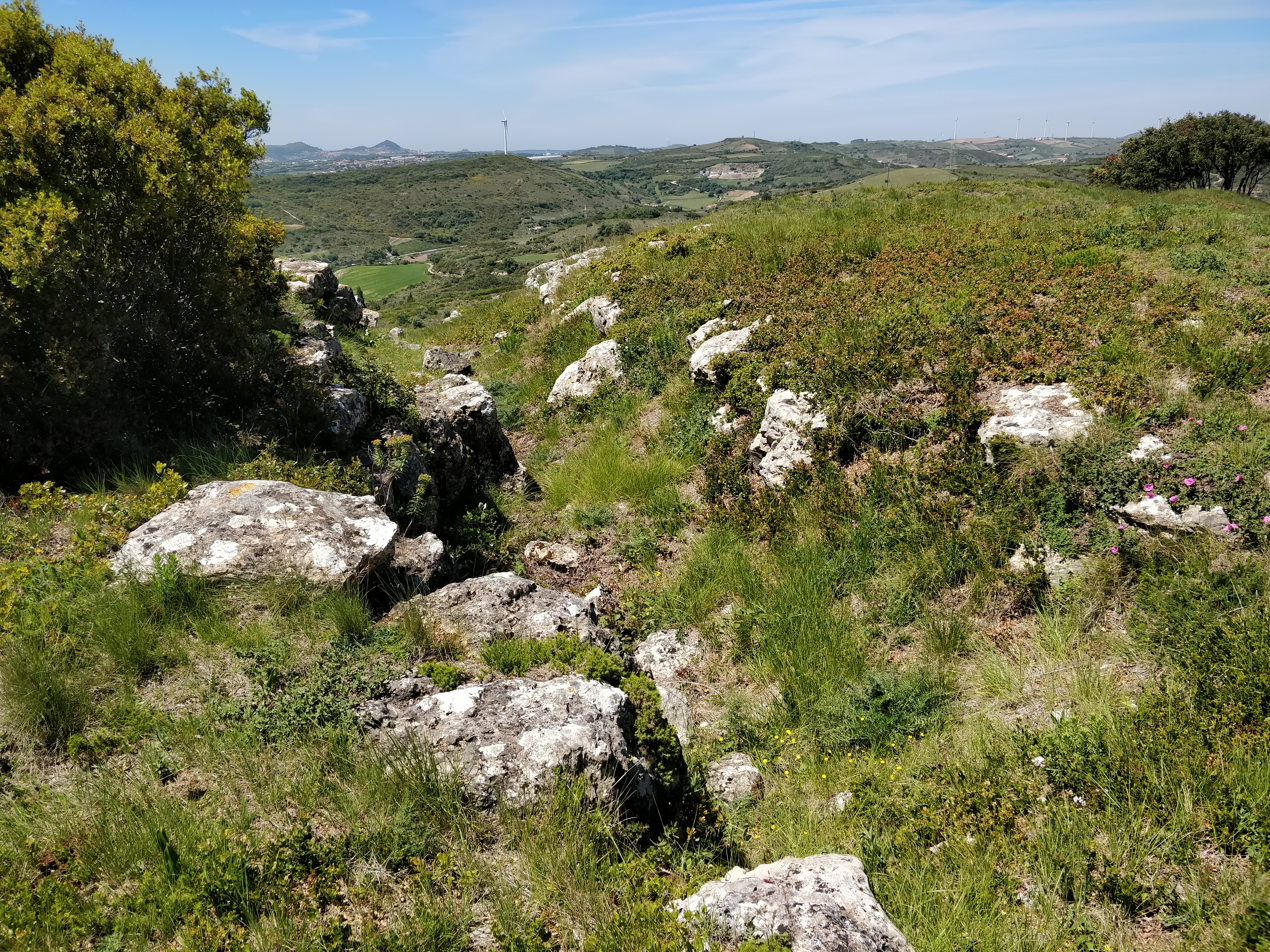
Fort of Ajuda Pequeno

=== Fort of Ajuda Pequeno ===
This fort, at 300 metres above sea level, is polygonal in shape and is surrounded by a moat partially dug out of the rocks. Its role was to support that of the Fort of Ajuda Grande in protecting the main north-south road. Unlike the Ajuda Grande it has not been restored but parts, such as the ditch, embrasures and the magazine, can still be discerned. It was No. 19 on the list of military works, had a garrison of 200 men with three 9-pounder cannon.

== See also ==
- List of forts of the Lines of Torres Vedras
