= List of forts of the Lines of Torres Vedras =

Forts in Portugal

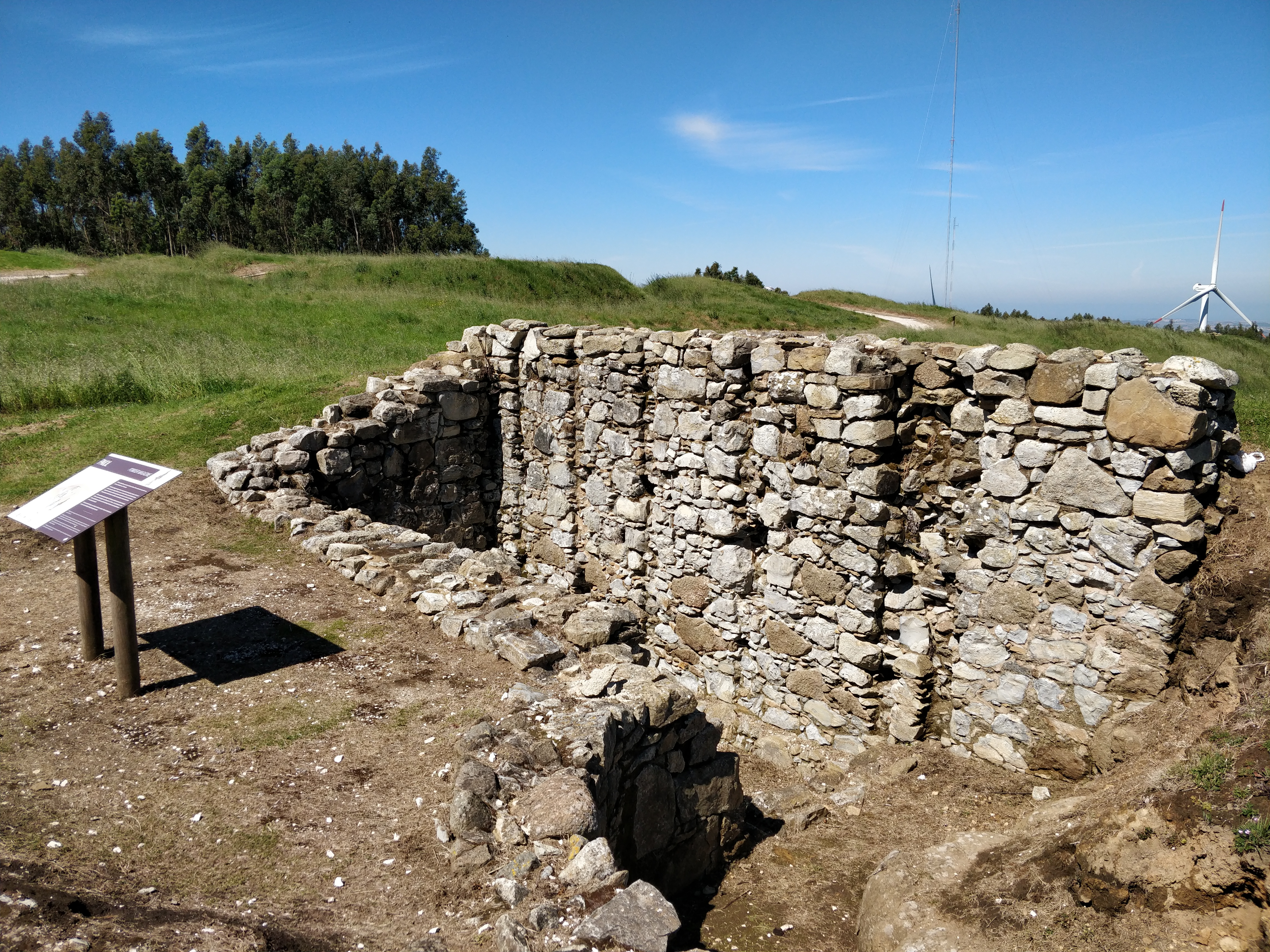
Fort of Alqueidão

The Lines of Torres Vedras were lines of forts and other military defences built in secrecy to defend Lisbon, capital of Portugal, from the French during the Peninsular War. Named after the town of Torres Vedras, their construction was ordered by the commander of the British troops, Arthur Wellesley, 1st Duke of Wellington. The Lines were declared a National Heritage by the Portuguese Government in March 2019.

In total, 152 military works were carried out from October 1809 to 1812 by Portuguese workers supervised by British engineers. Most involved completely new constructions, although some existing structures, such as the castle at Torres Vedras, were adapted and it was also common to incorporate existing hilltop windmills in the designs. Some of the forts remain visible and 29 are maintained by the municipalities of Torres Vedras, Arruda dos Vinhos, Loures, Mafra, Sobral de Monte Agraço, and Vila Franca de Xira. Much restoration work was carried out to celebrate the 200th anniversary of the Lines.

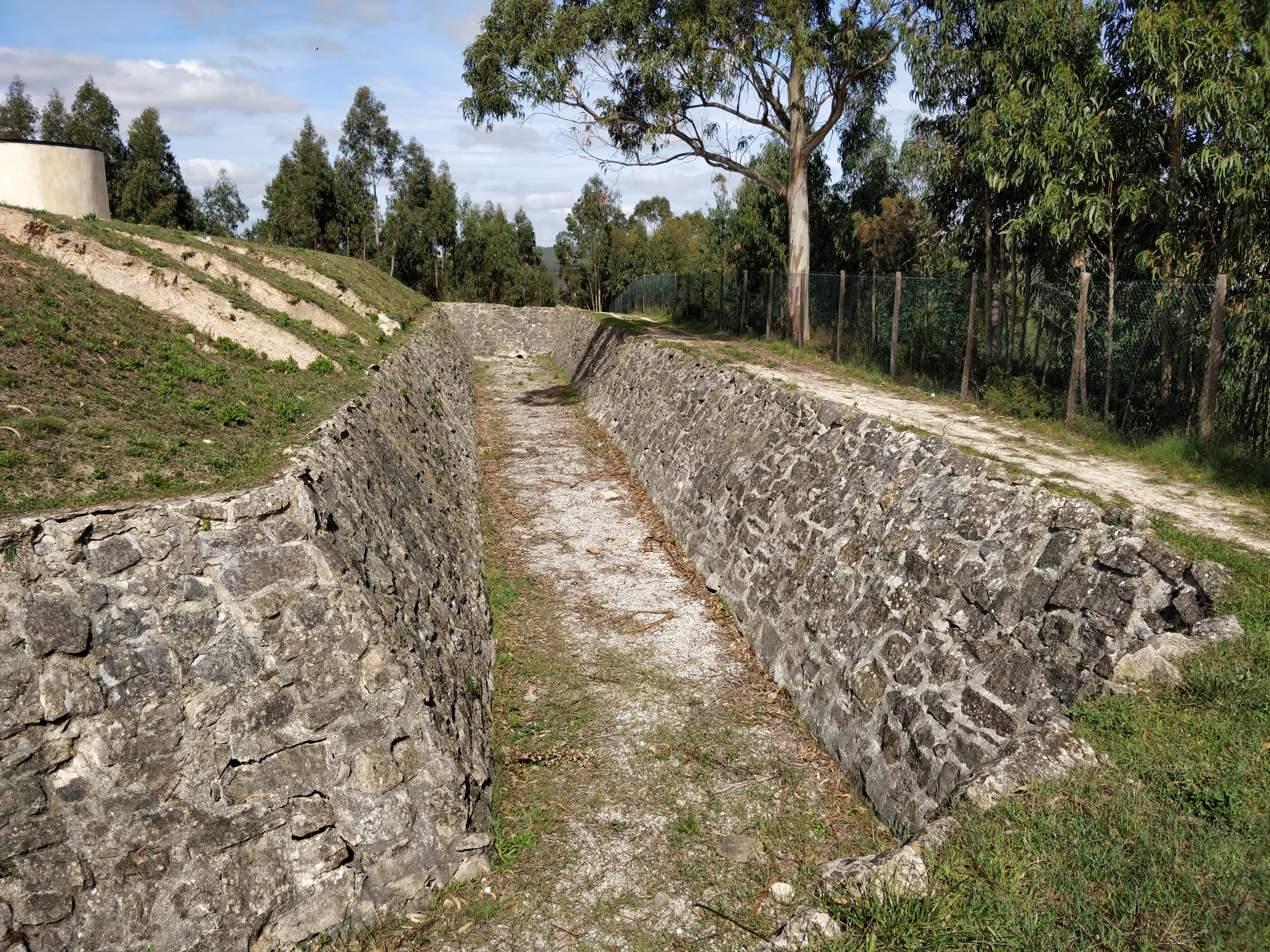
Fort of Olheiros

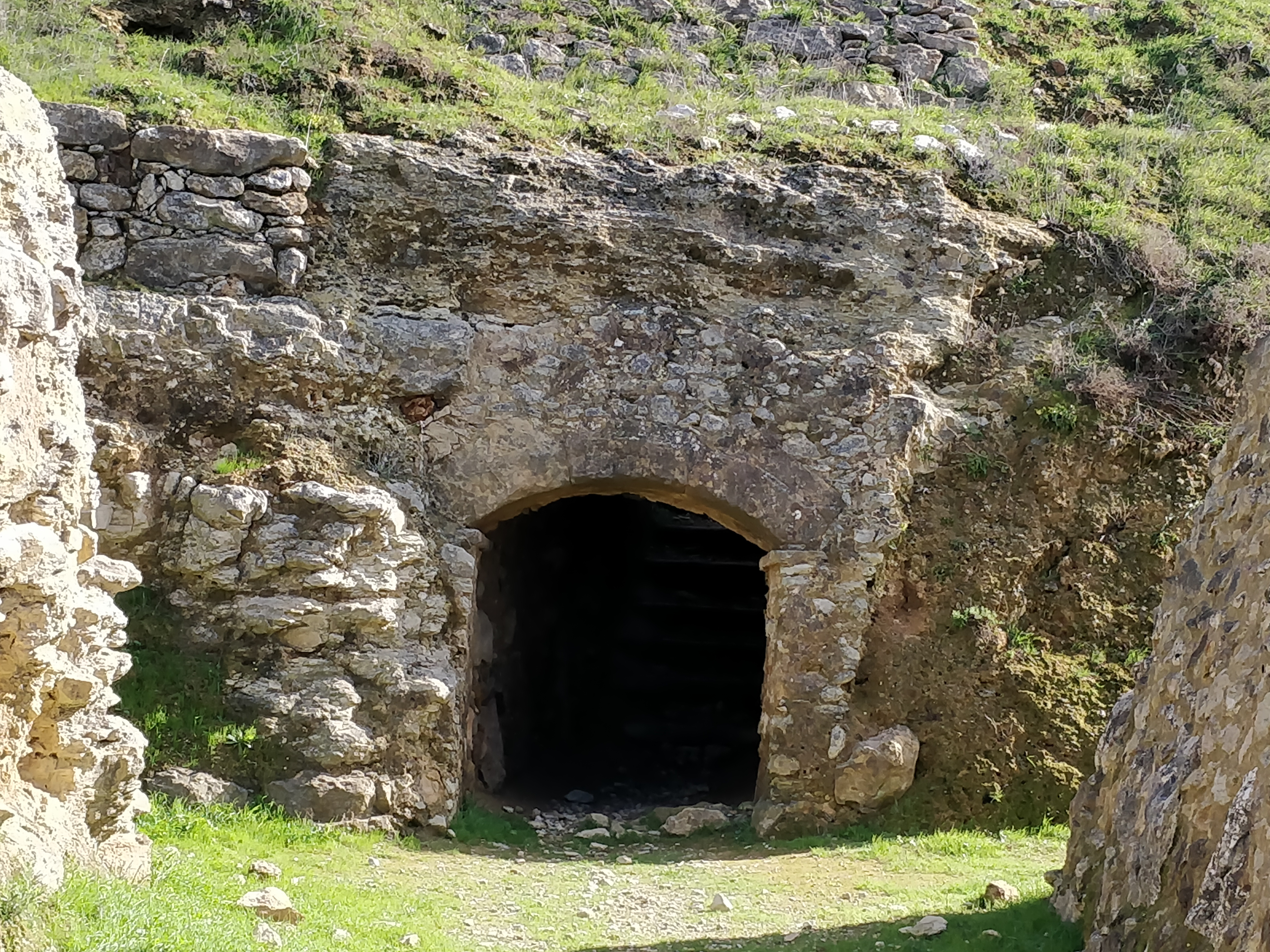
Fort of Zambujal

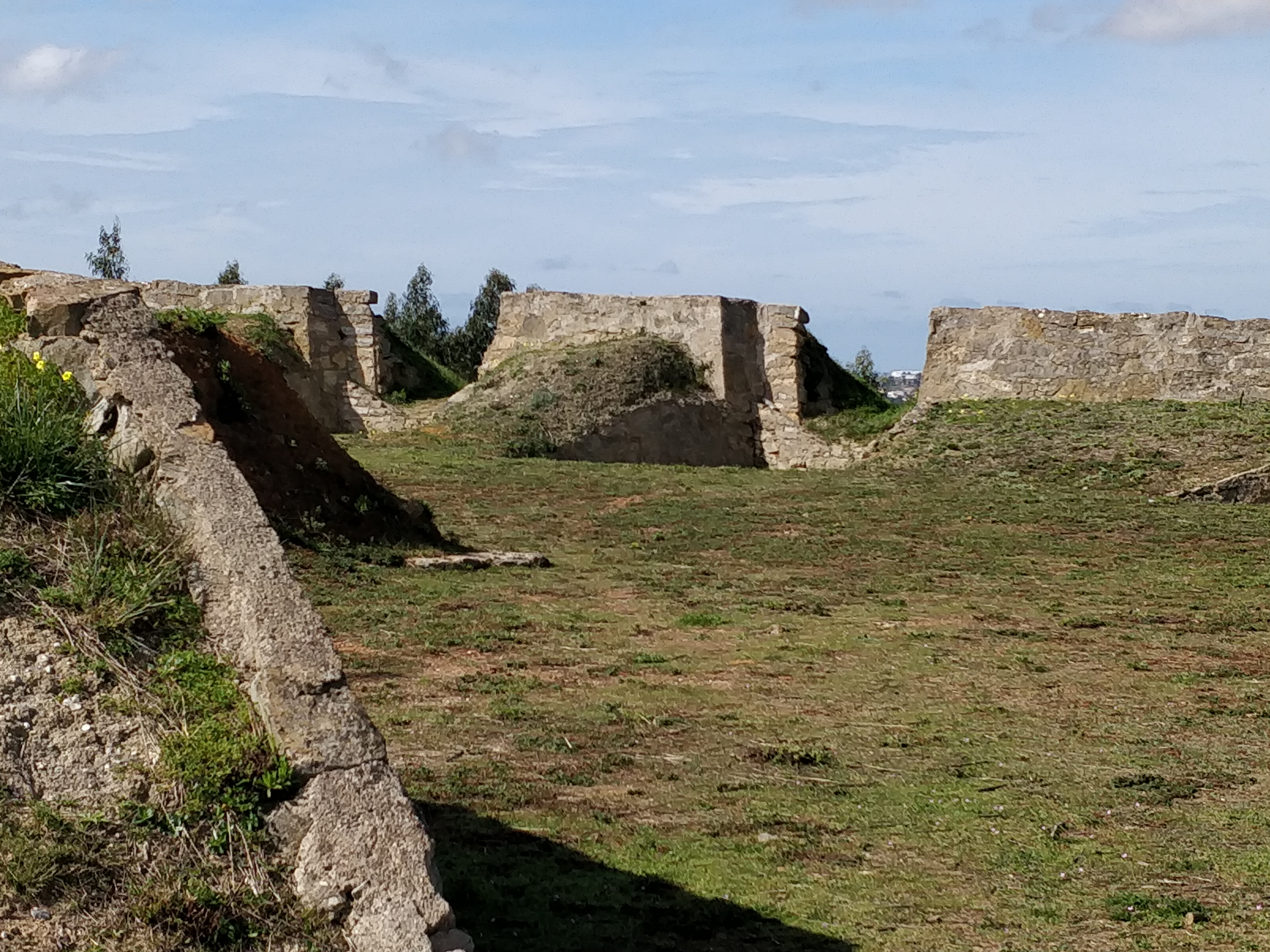
Fort of São Vicente

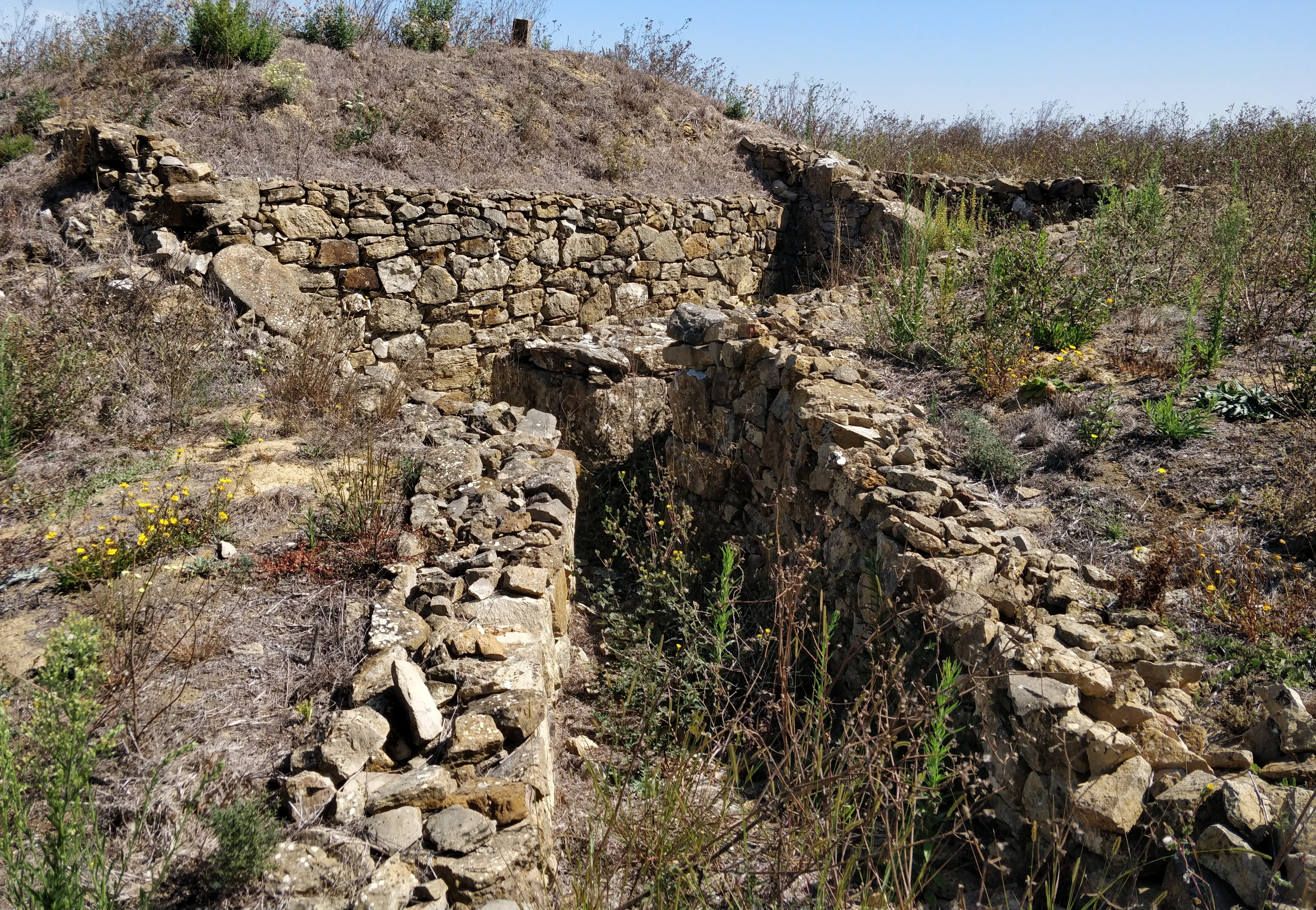
Fort of Cego

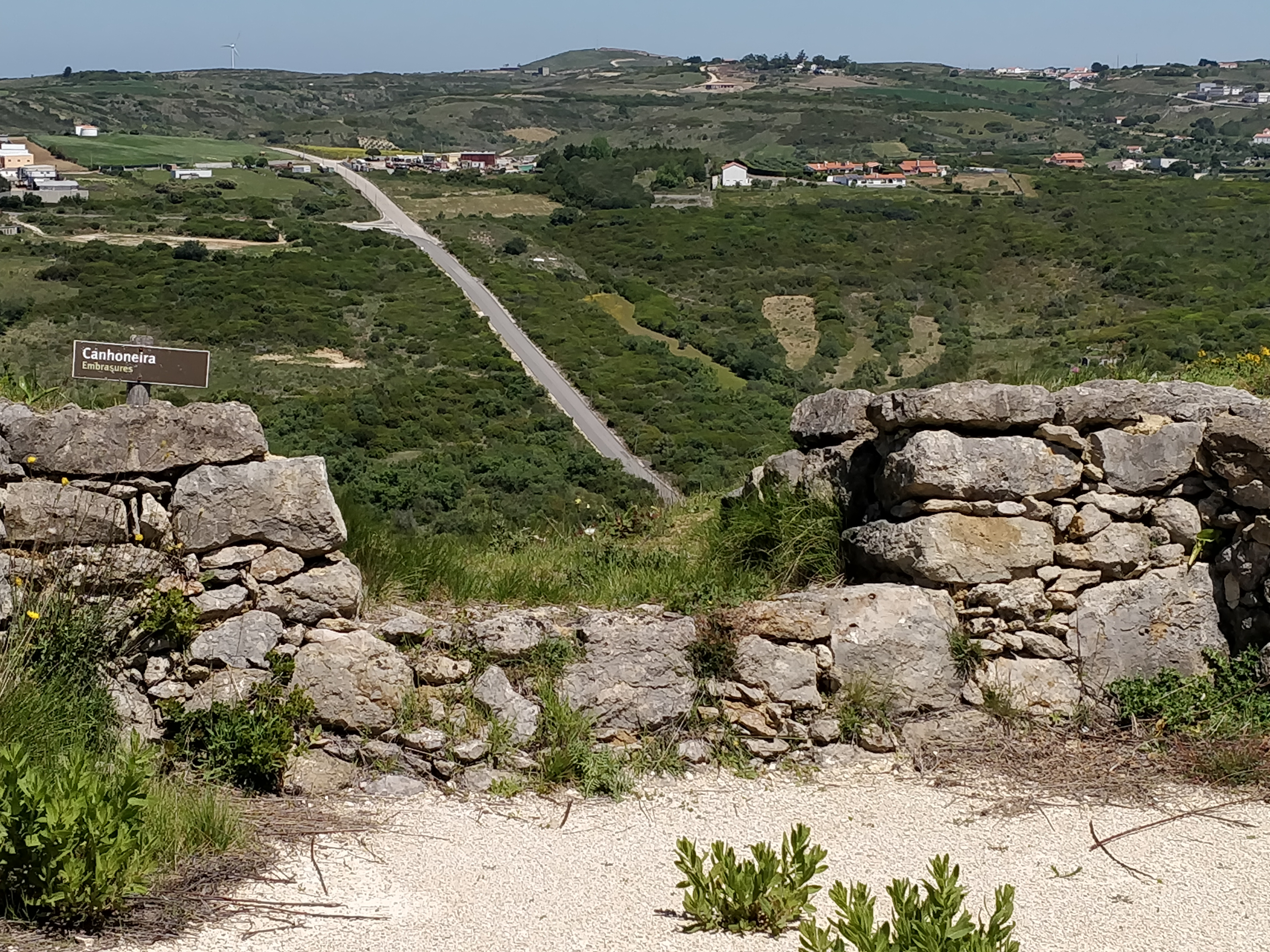
Fort of Ajuda Grande

== Forts ==
| Indicates restored and maintained fort |

| Number | Name | District | Men | Guns | Ref. |
|---|---|---|---|---|---|
| 1A | Battery of Tejo | Alhandra | 1,000 | 4 | |
| 1B | Entrenchments | Alhandra | 1,000 | 2 | |
| 1C | Battery of Estrada | Alhandra | 1,000 | 1 | |
| 1D | Battery of Estrada | Alhandra | 1,000 | 2 | |
| 1E | Battery of Estrada Real | Alhandra | 1,000 | 7 | |
| 1F | Battery of Subida | Alhandra | 1,000 | 2 | |
| 2 | Battery of Conde | Alhandra | 800 | 2 | |
| 3 | Redoubt of Boa Vista | Alhandra | 200 | 2 | |
| 4 | Battery of São Fernando | Alhandra | Unknown | 2 | |
| 5 | Redoubt Serra do Formoso | Alhandra | 120 | 3 | |
| 5A | Battery of Antas | Alhandra | 120 | 2 | |
| 5B | Battery 1a of Alfarge | Alhandra | 120 | 2 | |
| 5C | Battery 2a of Alfarge | Alhandra | 120 | 3 | |
| 5D | Battery 1a of Bulhaco | Alhandra | 120 | 2 | |
| 5E | Battery 2a of Bulhaco | Alhandra | 120 | 2 | |
| 5F | Battery 1a of Serra do Pinheiro | Alhandra | 120 | 2 | |
| 5G | Battery 2a of Serra do Pinheiro | Alhandra | 120 | 1 | |
| 6 | Battery of Meldros | Alhandra | Unknown | 2 | |
| 7 | Fort of Calhandriz | Alhandra | 200 | 3 | |
| 8 | Fort of Trancoso | Alhandra | 200 | 3 | |
| 9 | Fort of Casal do Cego | Alhandra | 280 | 3 | |
| 10 | Fort of Carvalha | Alhandra | 400 | 3 | |
| 11 | Fort of Moinho do Céu | Alhandra | 300 | 4 | |
| 12 | Fort of Passo | Sobral | 120 | 3 | |
| 13 | Fort of Caneira | Sobral | 120 | 2 | |
| 14 | Fort of Alqueidão | Sobral | 1,590 | 25 | |
| 15 | Fort of Machado | Sobral | 460 | 7 | |
| 16 | Fort of Trinta | Sobral | 250 | 4 | |
| 17 | Fort of Simplício | Sobral | 300 | 8 | |
| 18 | Fort of Ajuda Grande | Bucelas | 300 | 4 | |
| 19 | Fort of Ajuda Pequeno | Bucelas | 200 | 3 | |
| 20 | Fort of São Vicente | Torres Vedras | 470 | 8 | |
| 21 | Fort of São Vicente | Torres Vedras | 270 | 7/9 | |
| 22 | Fort of São Vicente | Torres Vedras | 380 | 9 | |
| 23 | Redoubt of Olheiros | Torres Vedras | 180 | 7 | |
| 24 | Redoubt of Forca | Torres Vedras | 300 | 7 | |
| 25 | Fort of São João | Torres Vedras | 200 | 2 | |
| 26 | Fort of Ordasqueira | Torres Vedras | 300 | 3 | |
| 27 | Castle of Torres Vedras | Torres Vedras | 500 | 5 | |
| 28 | Fort Pequeno da Enxara | Portela | 270 | 3 | |
| 29 | Fort Grande da Enxara | Portela | 280 | 4 | |
| 30 | Redoubt of Grilo | Torres Vedras | 340 | 4 | |
| 31 | Redoubt of Alquiteria | Torres Vedras | 370 | 3 | |
| 32 | Fort of Formigal | Torres Vedras | 260 | 4 | |
| 33 | Fort of Salgado | Bucelas | 300 | 4 | |
| 34 | Fort of Curral | Bucelas | 200 | 3 | |
| 35 | Redoubt of Quintela Pequeno | Bucelas | 120 | 4 | |
| 36 | Redoubt of Quintela Grande | Bucelas | 370 | 9 | |
| 37 | Fort of Abrunheira | Bucelas | 50 | 3 | |
| 38 | Fort of Casa | Bucelas | 340 | 5 | |
| 39 | Fort of Quintela Reentrante | Bucelas | 340 | 8 | |
| 40 | Fort of Aguieira | Bucelas | 150 | Unknown | |
| 41 | Redoubt of Portela Grande | Bucelas | 240 | 5 | |
| 42 | Fort of Portela Pequeno | Bucelas | 350 | 6 | |
| 43 | Battery of Vizo | Bucelas | Unknown | 4 | |
| 44 | Battery of Cachada | Bucelas | Unknown | 2 | |
| 45 | Battery of Penedos | Bucelas | Unknown | 3 | |
| 46 | Battery of Oliveiras | Bucelas | Unknown | 2 | |
| 47 | Battery of Galvões | Bucelas | Unknown | 3 | |
| 48 | Fort of Tojal | Bucelas | 200 | 2 | |
| 49 | Fort of Picoto | Montachique | Unknown | 2 | |
| 50 | Redoubt of Quadradinho | Montachique | 160 | 2 | |
| 51 | Fort of Freixial | Montachique | 300 | 4 | |
| 52 | Fort of Capitão | Montachique | 190 | 3 | |
| 53 | Fort of Presinheira | Montachique | 230 | 2 | |
| 54 | Fort of Moinho | Montachique | 210 | 0 | |
| 55 | Fort of Vale | Montachique | 150 | 3 | |
| 56 | Fort of Permouro | Mafra | 150 | 2 | |
| 57 | Fort of Mosqueiro | Montachique | 270 | 3 | |
| 58 | Fort of Carrascal | Montachique | 310 | 3 | |
| 59 | Fort of Moinho da Carambela | Montachique | 260 | 4 | |
| 60 | Redoubt of Achada 1 | Montachique | 150 | 2 | |
| 61 | Redoubt of Achada 2 | Montachique | 190 | 2 | |
| 62 | Fort of Alto do Cheira | Montachique | 390 | 3 | |
| 63 | Fort of Casal da Serra | Montachique | 280 | 3 | |
| 64 | Fort of Canto do Muro da Tapada | Montachique | 210 | 3 | |
| 65 | Fort of Santa Maria | Montachique | 270 | 3 | |
| 66 | Fort of Feira | Montachique | 350 | 4 | |
| 67 | Fort of Cabeço Gordo | Montachique | 120 | 2 | |
| 68 | Fort of Matoutinho | Montachique | 260 | 4 | |
| 69 | Fort of Quinta do Fidalgo | Montachique | 240 | 4 | |
| 70 | Fort of Quinta do Estrangeiro | Montachique | 240 | 6 | |
| 71 | Fort of Portela | Montachique | 240 | 4 | |
| 72 | Fort of Estrada | Montachique | 130 | 2 | |
| 73 | Fort of Coutada | Montachique | 340 | 3 | |
| 74 | Fort of Casal da Pedra | Mafra | 190 | 2 | |
| 75 | Fort of Milhariça | Mafra | 70 | 2 | |
| 76 | Fort of Sonível | Mafra | 390 | 4 | |
| 77 | Fort of Juncal | Mafra | 380 | 4 | |
| 78 | Fort of Telhadouro | Mafra | 110 | 3 | |
| 79 | Fort of Gio | Mafra | 270 | 3 | |
| 80 | Fort of Quinta da Boa Viagem | Mafra | 310 | 3 | |
| 81 | Fort of Serra de Chipre | Mafra | 280 | 3 | |
| 82 | Fort of Patarata | Mafra | 210 | 4 | |
| 83 | Fort of Meio | Mafra | 240 | 3 | |
| 84 | Fort of Curral do Linho | Mafra | 290 | 3 | |
| 85 | Fort of Areeiro | Mafra | 290 | 3 | |
| 86 | Fort of Nossa Senhora da Paz | Mafra | 280 | 3 | |
| 87 | Fort of Pinheiro | Mafra | 340 | 3 | |
| 88 | Fort of Cabeço do Neto | Mafra | 200 | 3 | |
| 89 | Fort of Moxarro | Mafra | 310 | 3 | |
| 90 | Fort of Penegache | Mafra | 230 | 3 | |
| 91 | Fort of Algoa | Mafra | 200 | 3 | |
| 92 | Fort of Picoto | Mafra | 180 | 3 | |
| 93 | Fort of Marvão | Mafra | 330 | 3 | |
| 94 | Fort of Ribamar | Mafra | 320 | 2 | |
| 95 | Fort of Zambujal | Mafra | 250 | 2 | |
| 96 | Fort of Carvoeira | Mafra | 280 | 3 | |
| 97 | Fort of São Julião | Mafra | 350 | 2 | |
| 98 | Fort of Algueirão | São Julião | 1,340 | 26 | |
| 99 | Battery of Arieiro | São Julião | 70 | 6 | |
| 100 | Battery of Estrada | São Julião | 50 | 5 | |
| 101 | Redoubt no.1 of Medrosa | São Julião | 250 | 10 | |
| 102 | Redoubt no.2 of Medrosa | São Julião | 260 | 8 | |
| 103 | Redoubt no.1 of Antas | São Julião | 130 | 3 | |
| 104 | Redoubt no.2 of Antas | São Julião | 100 | 2 | |
| 105 | Redoubt no.3 of Antas | São Julião | 170 | 2/4 | |
| 106 | Redoubt of Lomba | São Julião | 320 | 6 | |
| 107 | Redoubt of Quinta Nova | São Julião | 800 | 6 | |
| 108 | Redoubt of Junqueiro | São Julião | 360 | 6 | |
| 109 | Redoubt of Figueirinha | São Julião | 500 | 8 | |
| 110 | Fortified line 103–coast | São Julião | 1,000 | 3 | |
| 111 | Fort of Passo | Torres Vedras | 250 | 5 | |
| 112 | Fort of Gentias | Torres Vedras | 220 | 4 | |
| 113 | Battery of Foz | Torres Vedras | 50 | 2 | |
| 114 | Fort no.1 of Subserra | Alhandra | 100 | 2/3 | |
| 114A | Battery Nova de Subserra | Alhandra | 100 | 2 | |
| 115 | Fort no.2 of Subserra | Alhandra | 100 | 2 | |
| 116 | Fort no.3 of Subserra | Alhandra | 100 | 5 | |
| 116A | Battery annex for Fort no.3 of Subserra | Alhandra | 100 | Unknown | |
| 116B | Battery do Casal da Entrega | Alhandra | 100 | 4 | |
| 117 | Redoubt Novo da Costa da Freiria | Alhandra | 150 | Unknown | |
| 118 | Fort of Sinais | Alhandra | 400 | 8 | |
| 119 | Redoubt of Dois Moinhos | Alhandra | 350 | 6 | |
| 119A | No proof built, but 119B exists | | 350 | | |
| 119B | Fort of Subida da Serra | Alhandra | 350 | 2 | |
| 120 | Fort Novo do Formoso | Alhandra | 130 | 2 | |
| 121 | Fort no.1 of Calhandriz | Alhandra | 250 | 4 | |
| 122 | Fort no.2 of Calhandriz | Alhandra | 300 | 3 | |
| 123 | Fort no.3 of Calhandriz | Alhandra | 300 | 4 | |
| 124 | Fort no.4 of Calhandriz | Montachique | 350 | 4 | |
| 124A | Battery of Calhandriz | Montachique | 350 | 2 | |
| 125 | Fort of Serra de Arpim | Montachique | 250 | 4 | |
| 126 | Fort Novo do Cabo | Bucelas | 188 | 2 | |
| 127 | Fort of Moinho | Bucelas | 154 | Unknown | |
| 128 | Fort of Archeira | Portela | 500 | 6 | |
| 129 | Fort of Feiteira | Portela | 350 | 6 | |
| 130 | Fort of Catefica | Portela | 200 | 5 | |
| 131 | Battery of Cruz | Torres Vedras | 90 | 4 | |
| 132 | Battery of Palheiros | Torres Vedras | 150 | 6 | |
| 133 | Battery of Pedrulhos | Torres Vedras | 120 | 4 | |
| 134 | Battery of Outeiro da Prata | Torres Vedras | 110 | 4 | |
| 135 | Battery of Carrasqueira | Torres Vedras | 160 | 4 | |
| 136 | Battery of Milharosa | Torres Vedras | 150 | 4 | |
| 137 | Battery of Outeiro da França | Torres Vedras | 100 | 4 | |
| 138 | Battery of Pombal | Torres Vedras | 100 | 2 | |
| 139 | Battery of Bordinheira | Torres Vedras | 160 | 4 | |
| 140 | Battery of Outeiro do Monte | Torres Vedras | 120 | 4 | |
| 141 | Battery of Mogo | Torres Vedras | 180 | 4 | |
| 142 | Battery of Bonabal | Torres Vedras | 150 | 4 | |
| 143 | Fort of Galpeira | Torres Vedras | 150 | 4 | |
| 144 | Battery of Mouguelas | Torres Vedras | 130 | 4 | |
| 145 | Fort of Belmonte | Torres Vedras | 250 | 4 | |
| 146 | Fort of Bececarias | Torres Vedras | 250 | 6 | |
| 147 | Battery of Ponte do Rol I | Torres Vedras | 0 | Unknown | |
| 148 | Battery of Ponte do Rol II | Torres Vedras | 0 | Unknown | |
| 149 | Fort Novo da Ordasqueira | Torres Vedras | 250 | 6 | |
| 150 | Battery of Ribaldeira | Portela | 250 | 6 | |
| 151 | Redoubt of Patameira | Portela | 300 | Unknown | |
| 152 | Fort Novo | Sobral | 250 | 6 | |
