= Fort of Subserra =

19th-century fort in Portugal

- Lisbon District, Near Alhandra in Portugal
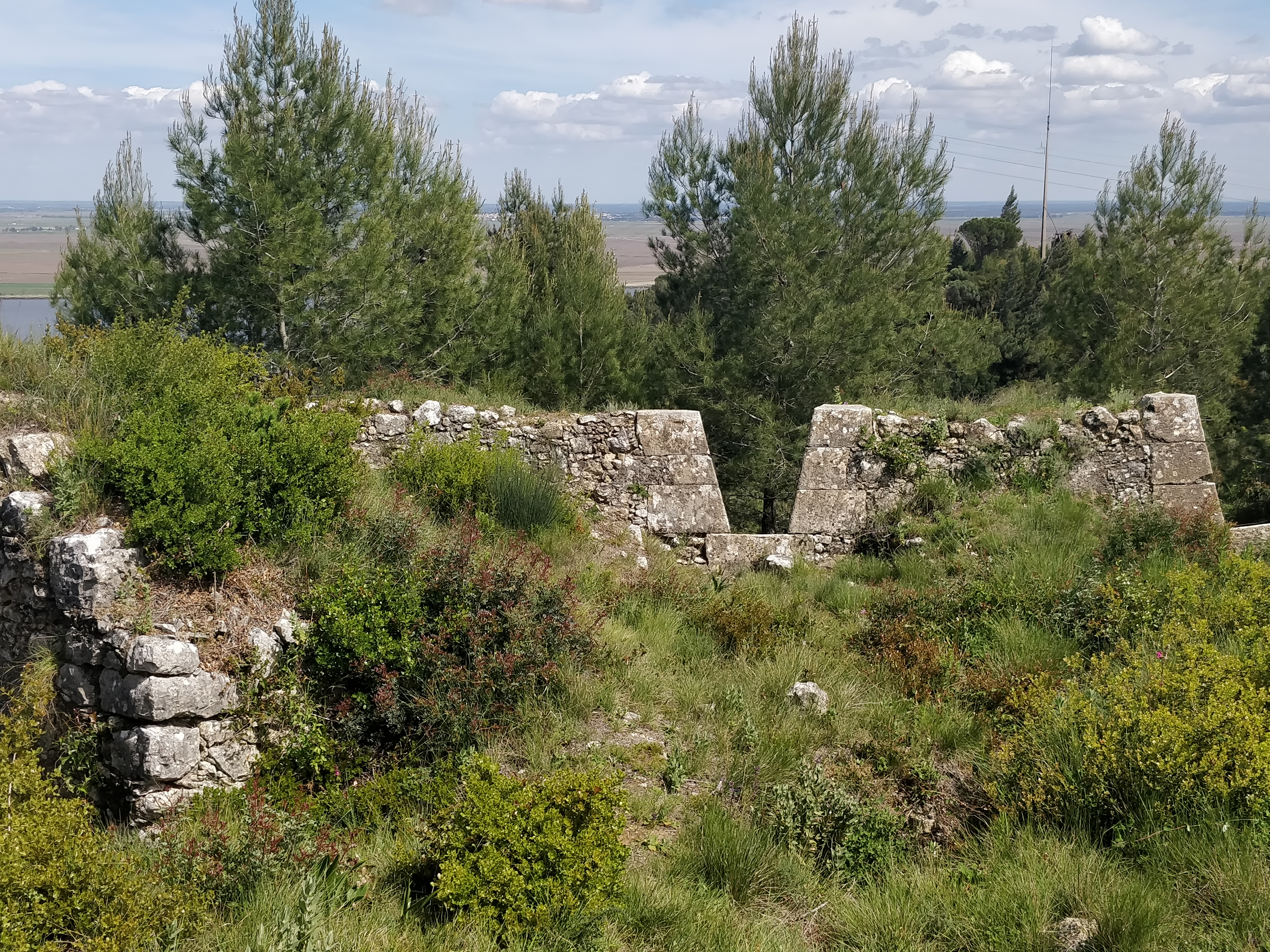
- Part of the remains of the fort

Site information
- Type: Fort
- Open to the public: Yes.
- Condition: Preserved and partly restored.

Location
- Coordinates: 38°55′32″N 9°01′23″W

Site history
- Built: 1810
- Built by: Duke of Wellington
- Fate: Unused in battle

The Fort of Subserra (No. 1), also known as the Fort of Alhandra, is situated at 142 metres above sea level close to Alhandra in the municipality of Vila Franca de Xira in the Lisbon District of Portugal. Together with other smaller redoubts and batteries that also had the Subserra name, it was built during the Peninsular War (1807–14) as part of the first line of defence of the Lines of Torres Vedras planned by Arthur Wellesley, 1st Duke of Wellington to protect the Portuguese capital of Lisbon and, if necessary, his own retreat.

== History ==
At the beginning of the Peninsular War, France and Spain signed the Treaty of Fontainebleau in October 1807. This provided for the invasion and subsequent division of Portuguese territory into three kingdoms. Following this, French troops under the command of General Junot entered Portugal, which requested support from the British. In July 1808 troops commanded by the Duke of Wellington, at the time known as Arthur Wellesley, landed in Portugal and defeated French troops at the Battles of Roliça and Vimeiro. This forced Junot to negotiate the Convention of Cintra, which led to the evacuation of the French army from Portugal. In March 1809, Marshal Soult led a new French expedition that advanced south to the city of Porto before being repulsed by Portuguese-British troops and forced to withdraw. After this retreat, Wellesley's forces defeated the French again at the Battle of Talavera.

Despite this victory Wellington realised that he was seriously outnumbered by the French army, and that he could be forced to retreat and possibly evacuate. He decided to strengthen the defences to the north of Lisbon by taking advantage of the hilly topography of that area. In October 1809, he ordered the building of the Lines of Torres as a system of fortifications, redoubts, escarpments, dams and other interventions. In total there were 152 works, which were all numbered and the Fort of Subserra was No. 114. It was a small, irregular pentagonal earthwork, well capped with stone, much of which is still visible. Construction began in February 1810 and it was finished within a few weeks. The fort was equipped with one six-pounder cannon and two nine-pounders for the three embrasures, as well as other artillery pieces. From October of that year it had a garrison of 100 Portuguese militia and gunners under the overall command of General Rowland Hill. Its objective was to defend the left flank of the São Fernando Battery (No. 4) and to cross fire with the New Subserra Battery, close by, thereby protecting the road that went from Arruda dos Vinhos to Alhandra through the Subserra Valley.

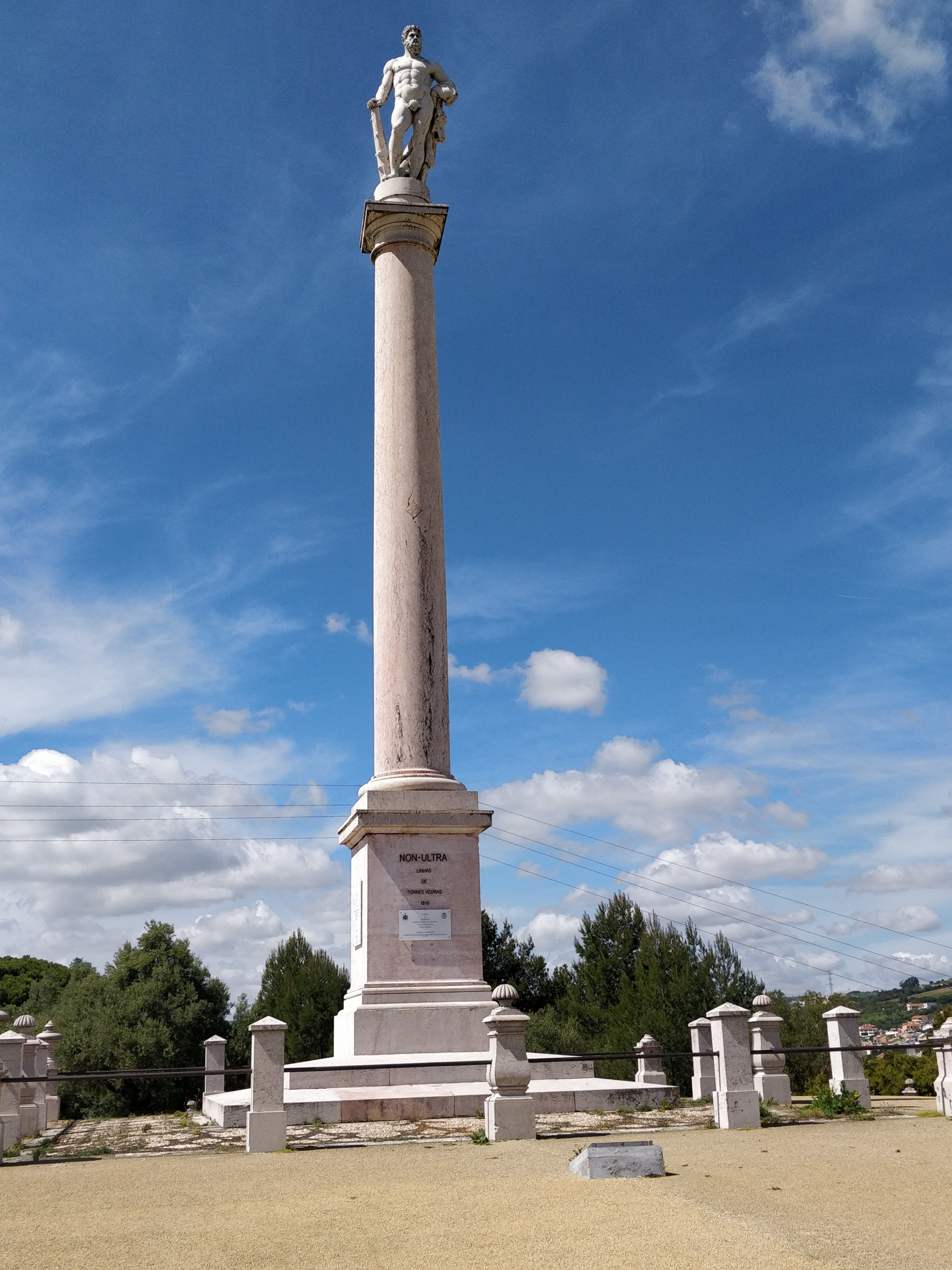
The monument to the Lines of Torres Vedras

The fort is close to a monument commemorating the role of the Torres Vedras Lines in the victory of the Anglo-Portuguese troops over the French armies. Built on the site of the Boavista redoubt (originally numbered as work No. 3), construction was finished in 1883. It takes the form of a column, topped by a statue of the classical Greek figure of Hercules. In 1911, two plaques were added to acknowledge the contributions of Sir Richard Fletcher, who supervised the construction of the Lines, and of José Maria das Neves Costa, on whose original topographic maps Wellington based his plans for the Lines.

== See also ==
- List of forts of the Lines of Torres Vedras
