= Forts of Enxara =

19th-century forts in Portugal

Forts of Enxara (Forte Grande and Forte Pequeno)
- Fortes de Santo António da Enxara dos Cavaleiros
- Mafra in Portugal
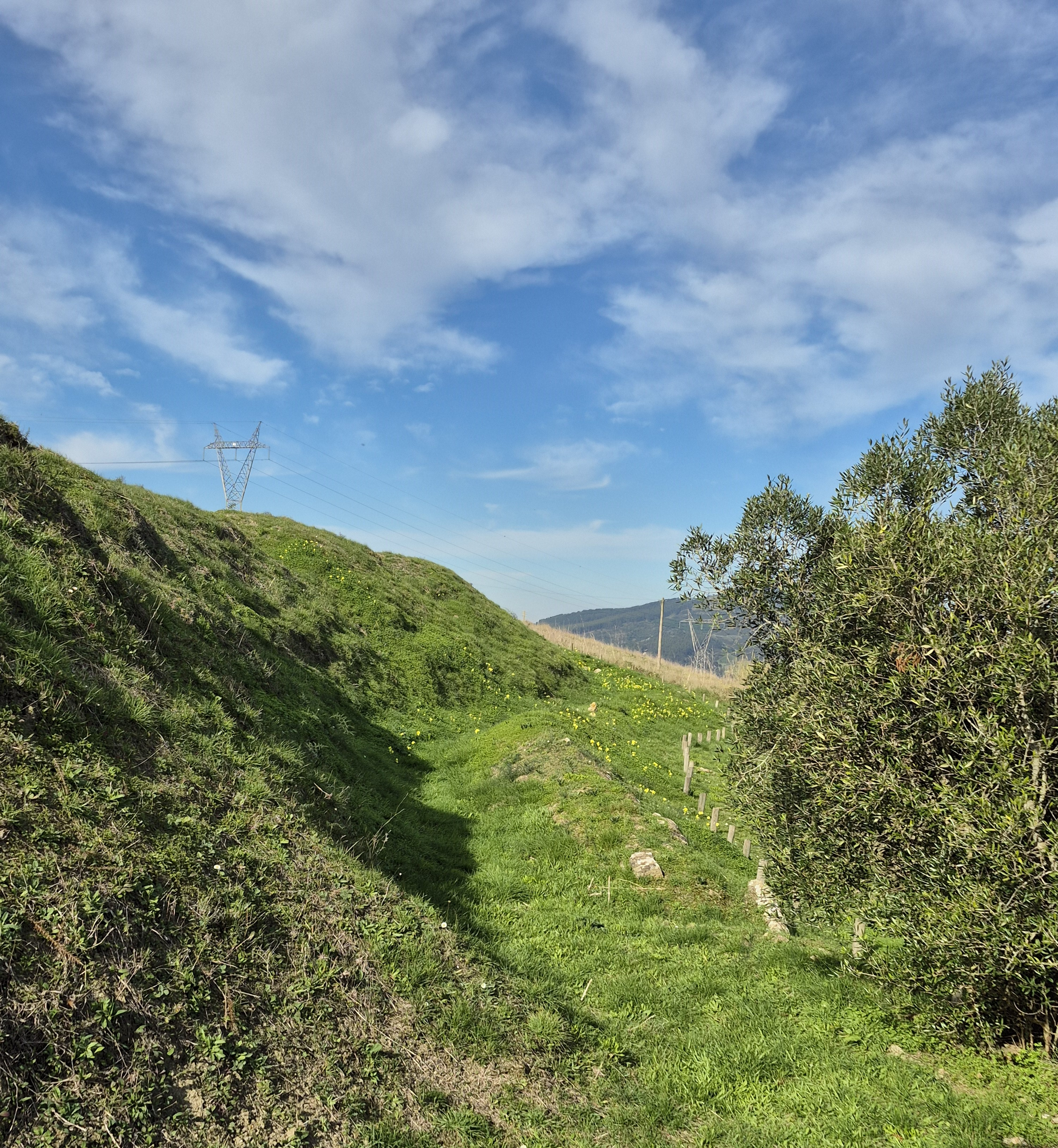

Site information
- Type: Forts
- Open to the public: Yes.
- Condition: Preserved and restored. Relatively little to see.

Location
- Coordinates: 38°59′22.5″N 9°13′21″W

Site history
- Built: 1810
- Built by: Duke of Wellington, with Portuguese workers
- Fate: Unused in battle

Garrison information
- Garrison: 270 (Grande); 280 (Pequeno)
- Occupants: Spanish troops under command of Pedro Caro Sureda, 3rd Marquis of La Romana

The Forts of Enxara dos Cavaleiros were two forts in the Mafra municipality of Portugal constructed in 1810 during the Peninsular War (1807–1814) under the orders of Arthur Wellesley, 1st Duke of Wellington. They formed part of the first of the three main Lines of Torres Vedras, which were defensive lines designed to protect the Portuguese capital Lisbon from a third invasion by the French or, in the event of defeat, to ensure the safe embarkation of a retreating British Army. Known as Forte Grande (large fort) and Forte Pequeno (small fort), the two forts were a short distance apart and were designed to defend the road from Torres Vedras south to Montachique, as well Wellington's headquarters in nearby Pero Negro, should the defenders to the north at the Fort of São Vicente, Fort of Olheiros and Torres Vedras Castle be overrun.

== The forts ==
=== Fort of Santo António da Enxara dos Cavaleiros (North), (Forte Grande) ===
There were 152 forts, batteries, redoubts and other defensive positions developed as part of the three Lines of Torres Vedras north of Lisbon. Forte Grande was given the number 29, with construction starting in March 1810. It was built at an altitude of 236 metres, with a star-shaped design. Intended to serve as a garrison for up to 270 soldiers, it had six emplacements for cannon and the troops were equipped with Baker rifles and Brown Bess muskets.

=== Fort of São Sebastião da Enxara dos Cavaleiros (South), (Forte Pequeno) ===
Designated Fort No. 28, Forte Pequeno was built at an altitude of 225 metres, about 400 metres to the southeast of Forte Grande. It had an elongated plan and was designed to be a garrison for 280 soldiers. Both this and Forte Grande were manned by Spanish soldiers under the command of Pedro Caro Sureda, 3rd Marquis of La Romana. It is believed to have had six cannon.

== Conservation ==
The two forts were among those restored by the six municipalities in which forts of the Lines can be found. They obtained funding in 2007 through the EEA and Norway Grants programme. This conservation work was awarded the European Union Prize for Cultural Heritage / Europa Nostra Awards in 2014.

== See also ==
- List of forts of the Lines of Torres Vedras
- Lines of Torres Vedras
