= Fort of Feira =

19th Century fort in Portugal

- Forte da Feira
- Lisbon District, Near Malveira in Portugal
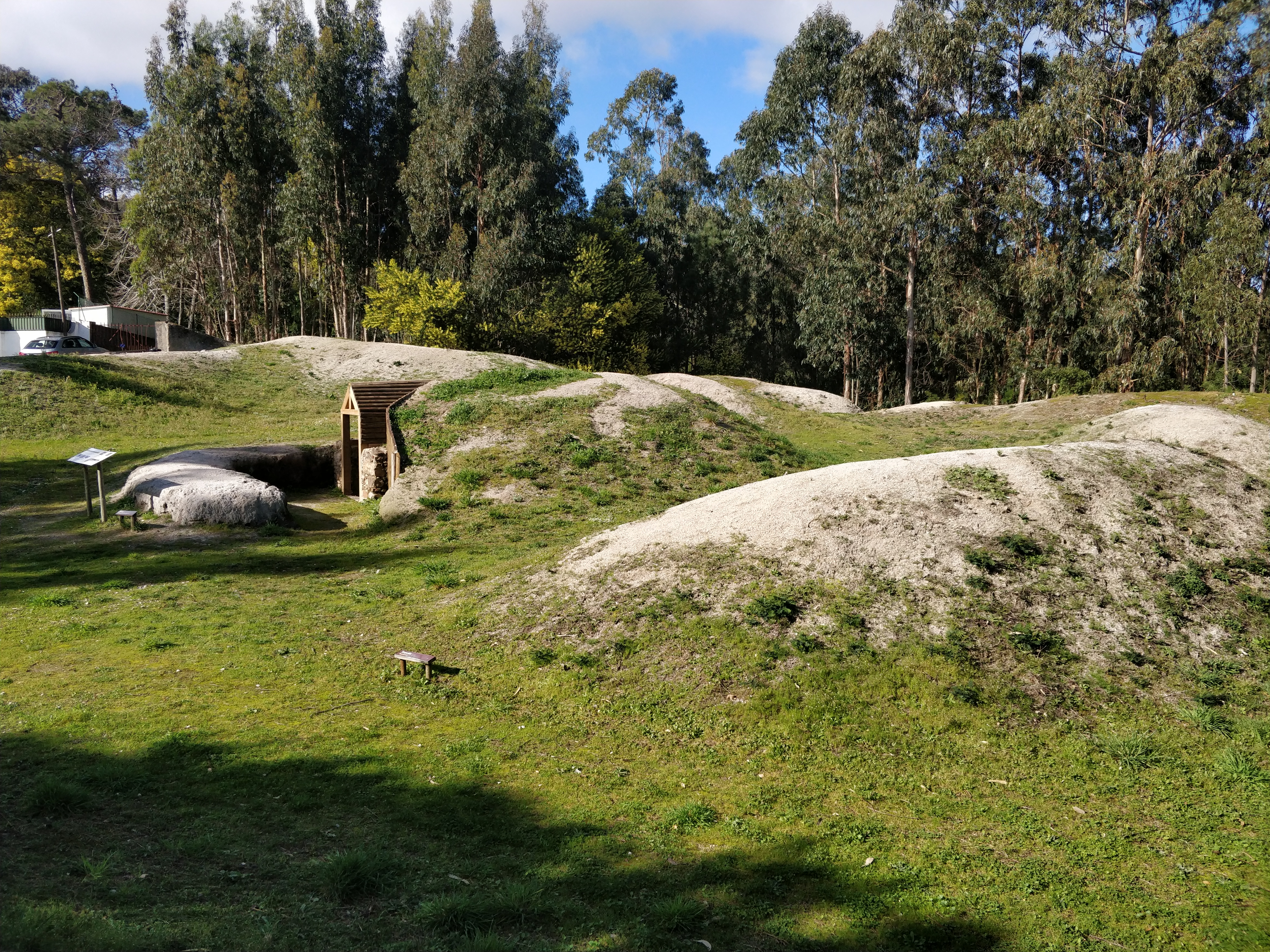

Site information
- Type: Fort
- Operator: Unoccupied
- Open to the public: Yes

Location
- Coordinates: 38°56′09″N 9°15′18″W

Site history
- Built: 1809-10
- Built by: Duke of Wellington
- Fate: Preserved

The Fort of Feira, also known as the Fort of Malveira, is located at an altitude of 226 metres, above the town of Malveira, in the municipality of Mafra, in Lisbon District, Portugal. It was built in 1809-10 as part of the Lines of Torres Vedras, three lines of forts and redoubts designed to protect Lisbon against French troops. The fort was reopened to the public in 2011.

== History ==
In 1807, during the Peninsular War (1807-14), France and Spain signed the secret Treaty of Fontainebleau foreseeing the invasion and subsequent division of Portuguese territory into three kingdoms. In the same year French troops commanded by General Junot entered Portugal. Portugal called for support from England while, at the same time, the Portuguese royal family left the country for Brazil. In 1808, Portuguese and British troops commanded by the Duke of Wellington defeated the French in the Battles of Roliça and Vimeiro. This forced Junot to negotiate the Convention of Cintra, which led to the evacuation of the French army from Portugal. A second invasion by French troops in 1809, commanded by Marshal Soult was forced to retreat. Wellington then decided to construct lines of defence for Lisbon, in order to defend against any further invasion and also to protect his own retreat and possible evacuation if overwhelmed by French forces. The Fort of Feira was constructed as part of the second line of the Lines of Torres Vedras. A third French invasion, headed by Marshal André Masséna advanced to the Lines of Torres Vedras but could not pass them and after five months was forced to retreat.

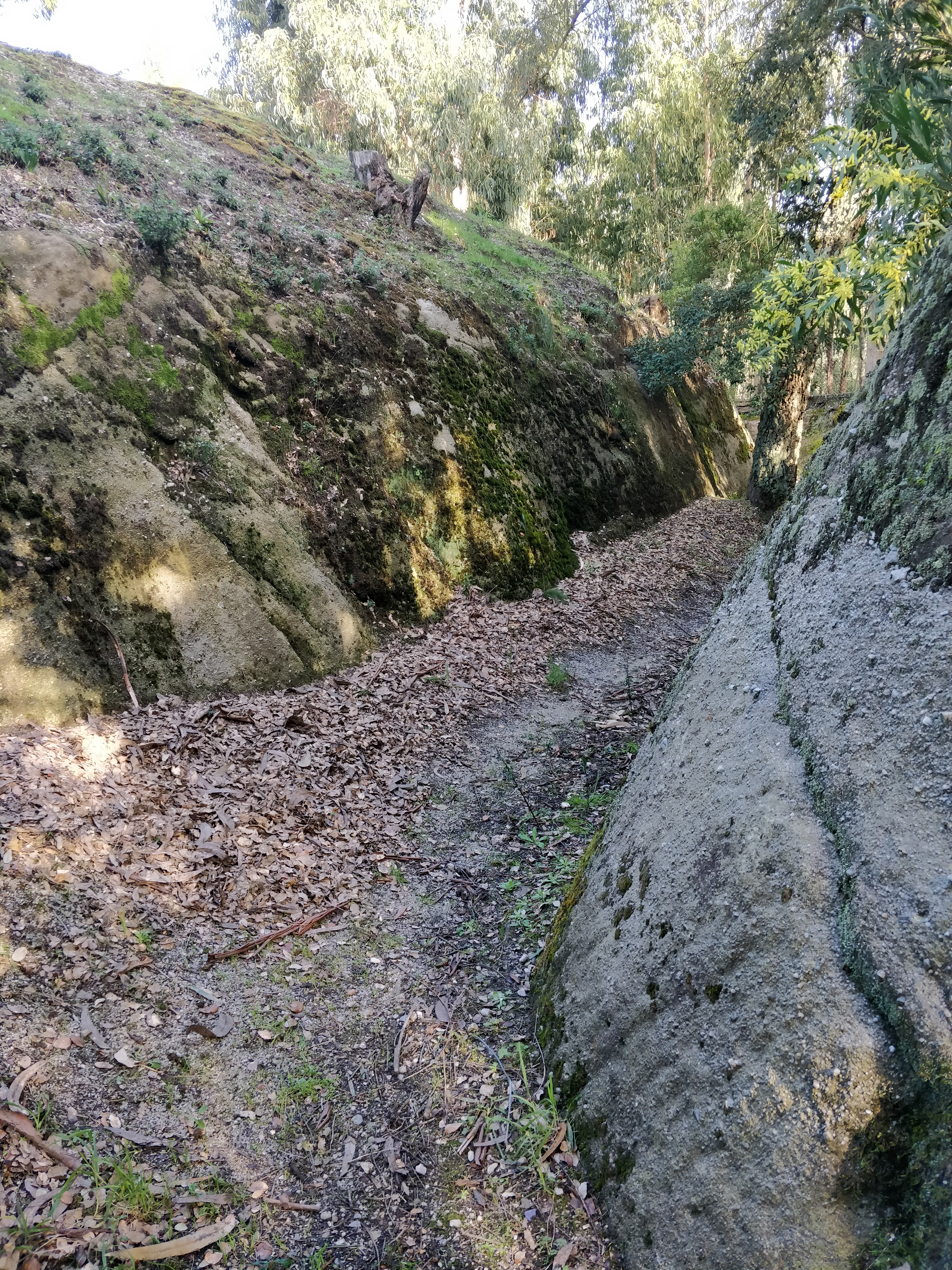
The moat around the Feira Fort

The name “Feira” (Fair) was derived from the cattle market held next to the fort’s site. Occupying a dominant position, the Fort of Feira was at the centre of a complex of 19 strongholds in the second Line of Torres Vedras. It took the form of a seven-pointed star, with a surrounding moat dug into the rock and filled with palisades. Its position permitted crossfire with three of the other forts. An 1829 report stated that the garrison would have been 350 soldiers and the fort would have had four cannon.

The fort was deactivated in 1818 and the artillery was removed. Initial restoration was carried out at the beginning of this Millennium and it was opened to the public in 2002. In 2010-11 it was closed to permit archaeological investigations that exposed structures such as the magazine, being reopened in July 2011.

== See also ==
- List of forts of the Lines of Torres Vedras
