= Fort of Ribas =

19th-century fort in Portugal

- Reduto de Ribas
- Lisbon District, Near Bucelas in Portugal
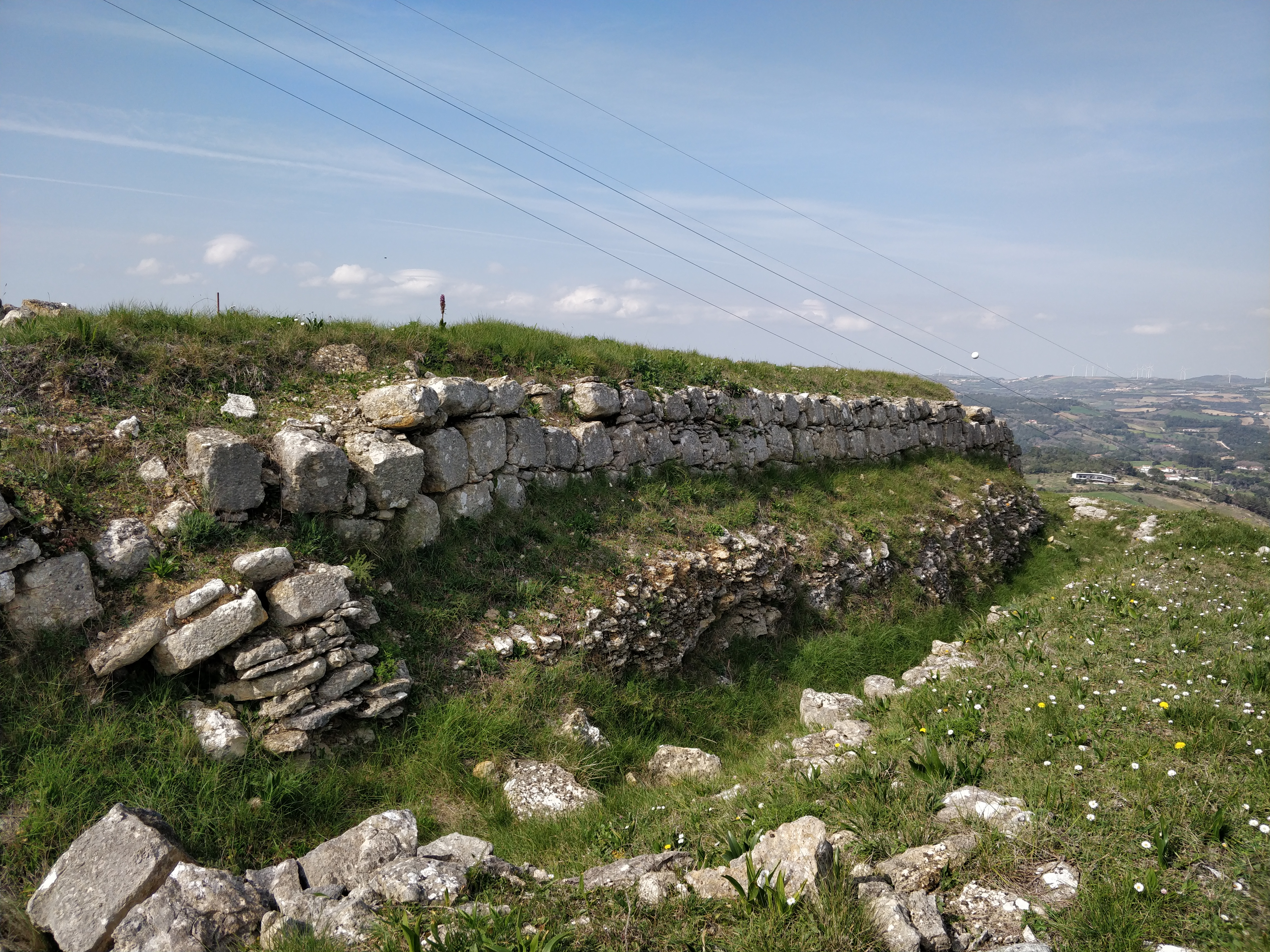
- The Ribas fort

Site information
- Type: Fort/Redoubt
- Operator: Unoccupied
- Open to the public: Yes

Location
- Coordinates: 38°53′43″N 9°09′43″W

Site history
- Built: 1809-10
- Built by: Duke of Wellington
- Fate: Preserved

Garrison information
- Garrison: 300

The Fort of Ribas, also known as the Redoubt of Ribas (Portuguese: Reduto de Ribas) and the Redoubt of Freixial Alto, is one of a group of fortifications in Portugal that made up the second of the three defensive Lines of Torres Vedras, between the Atlantic Ocean and the River Tagus, which were designed to protect the capital, Lisbon, from possible invasion by French troops during the Peninsular War. It was designed for a garrison of 300 soldiers, with three or four cannon. The fort is situated near the town of Bucelas in the Lisbon District of Portugal.

== History ==
Following the Treaty of Fontainebleau signed between France and Spain in October 1807, which provided for the invasion and subsequent division of Portuguese territory into three kingdoms, French troops under the command of General Junot entered Portugal, which requested support from the British. Thus, in July 1808 troops commanded by the Duke of Wellington landed in Portugal, advanced towards Lisbon and defeated French troops at the Battles of Roliça and Vimeiro, forcing Junot to surrender. In March 1809, Marshal Soult led a new French expedition that advanced south to the city of Porto before being repulsed by Portuguese-British troops and forced to withdraw.

However, the threat of further invasions by the French led Wellington to order the construction of the Lines of Torres Vedras in October 1809 in order to protect Lisbon from Napoléon Bonaparte's troops. The work was started immediately after his detailed instructions were issued and carried out until October of the following year. Consisting of 152 forts and redoubts forming three lines of defence over 80 kilometres, making maximum use of the existing topography, the defensive lines were also designed to protect Wellington’s own retreat and possible evacuation from the Fort of São Julião da Barra on the Tagus estuary if overwhelmed by French forces.

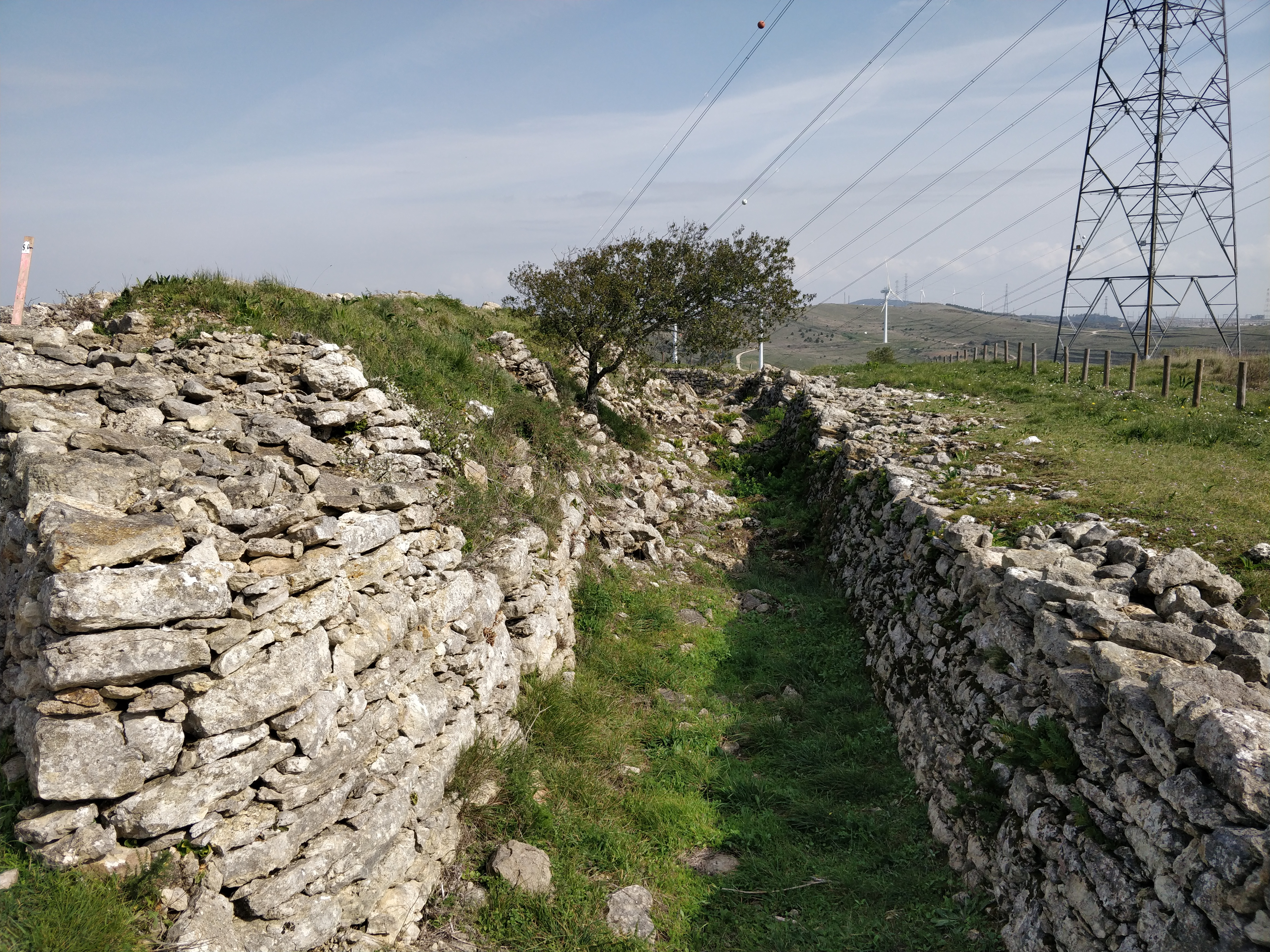
The Moat

Each fort or other construction was given a number for ease of identification and that allocated to the Fort of Ribas was 51. As with all of the 152 defensive points, it was built by Portuguese labourers and farmers under supervision of British and Portuguese engineers. It is situated on a limestone hill at an altitude of 305 metres and was constructed as an irregular five-sided polygon, with a man-made escarpment with limestone walls, and a dry moat with palisades. It had commanding views over the Freixal gorge and could see several other forts and redoubts, thus making the exchange of military signals easy.

Although the first line of forts to the north had been intended by Wellington to provide temporary defence, with the troops eventually retreating to the second line, the first line in fact proved adequate to repel the French troops, and the Fort of Ribas never saw action. It was restored as part of the 200th anniversary celebrations of the Peninsular War and can be reached easily by car, along a dirt road.

In March 2012, the Municipality of Loures inaugurated a Centre of Interpretation of the Lines of Torres at Bucelas with the objective of making known to visitors the whole history of the fortifications built during the French invasions.

== See also ==
- List of forts of the Lines of Torres Vedras
