= Fort of Zambujal =

19th-century fort in Portugal

- Forte do Zambujal
- Lisbon District, Near Mafra in Portugal
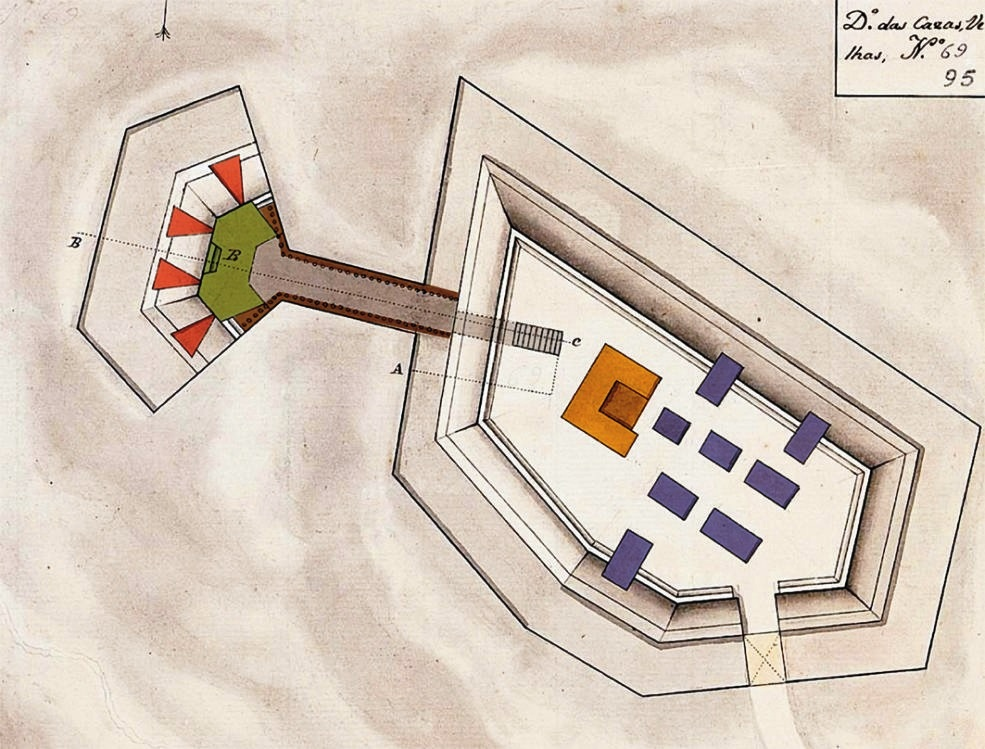
- Plan of the fort from 1814

Site information
- Type: Fort
- Operator: Unoccupied
- Open to the public: Yes

Location
- Coordinates: 38°56′57″N 9°23′22″W

Site history
- Built: 1809-1810
- Built by: Duke of Wellington
- Fate: Preserved

The Fort of Zambujal, also referred to as the Fort of Casas Velhas, is located near the town of Zambujal-Casas Velhas, in the parish of Carvoeira, municipality of Mafra, Lisbon District, Portugal. Constructed in 1809–1810, at 102 metres above sea level, it was one of the forts and other military works built by British and Portuguese troops to protect Lisbon from French forces, forming part of the Second Line of defence of the so-called Lines of Torres Vedras. Each work was given a number and Zambujal was No. 95.

== History ==
The threat of invasion of Portugal by the French during the Peninsular War (1807–1814) led to the construction of the Lines of Torres Vedras, to protect Lisbon from Napoléon Bonaparte's troops. The defences were ordered by the British commander, the Duke of Wellington after two French invasions had already been repelled. By so doing he was also seeking to protect his own retreat and possible evacuation if overwhelmed by French forces. The fort was built on a hill, allowing it to defend the surrounding gorge and valley and the road from Ericeira to Sintra. A third French invasion, headed by Marshal André Masséna, advanced to the Lines of Torres Vedras but could not pass them and after five months the French troops were forced to retreat. At its peak the fort was garrisoned by 250 soldiers and equipped with two cannon.

Built into rock the stronghold of the fort has a hexagonal design and is surrounded by a moat. It was built with a pronounced bastion for the cannon, connected to the stronghold by a tunnel through the rock. In 2009 archaeological excavations were carried out to analyze the construction techniques used. In the same year conservation and restoration works to control erosion and restore the fort were also carried out using funds from the European Economic Area Financial Mechanism allocated to restoration of the Lines of Torres Vedras.

== Gallery ==
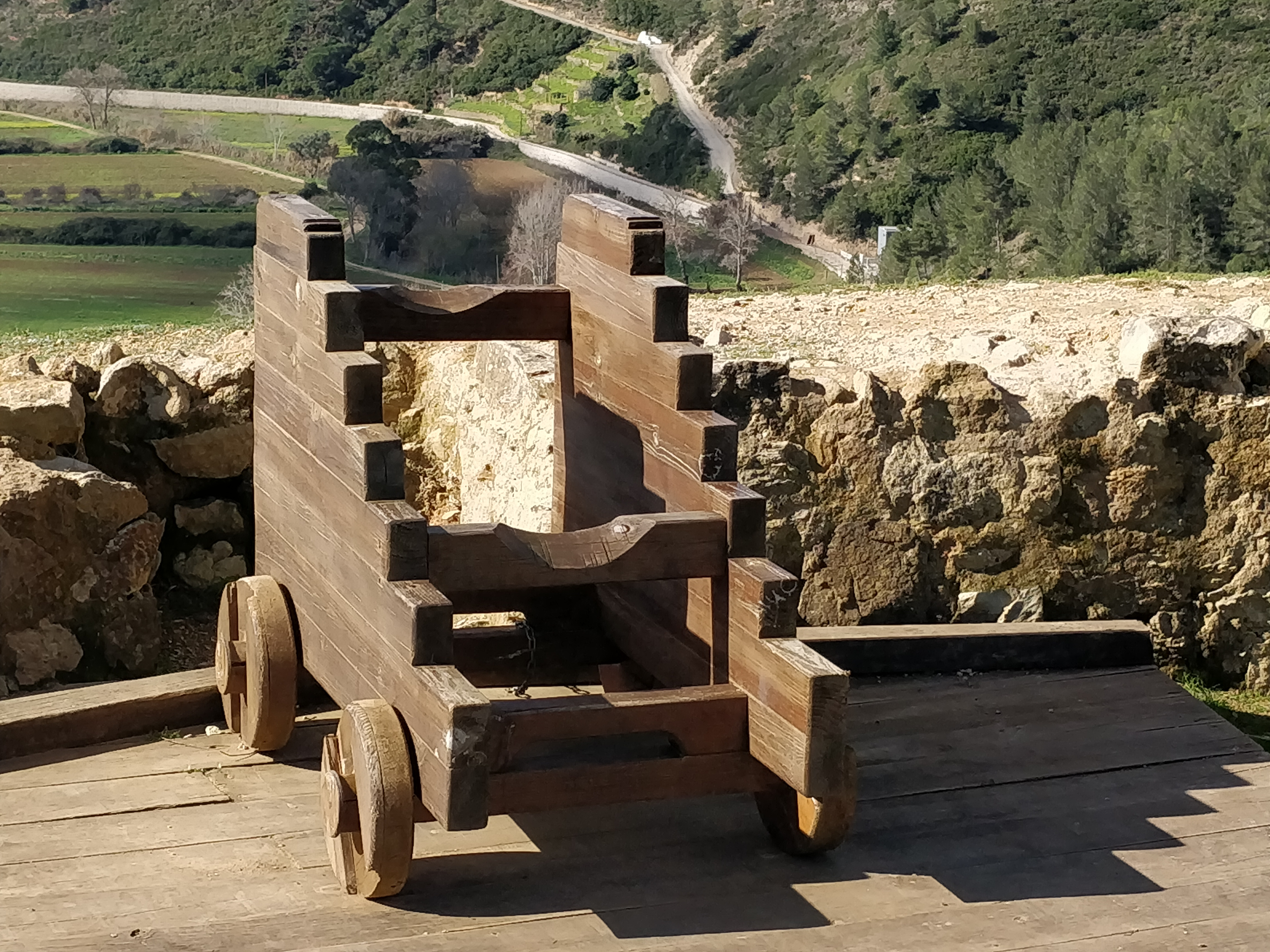
Fort of Zambujal bastion

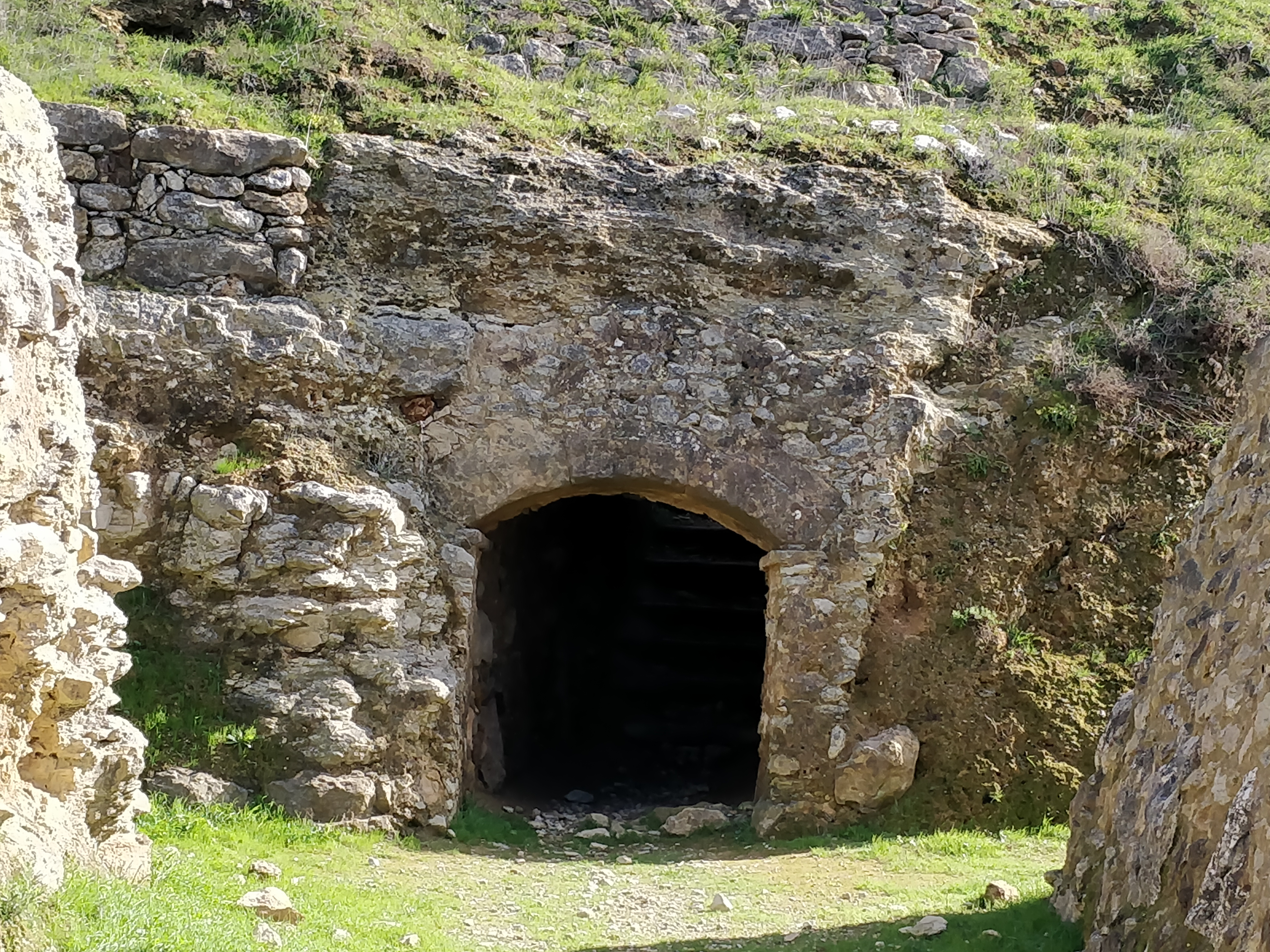
Tunnel connecting the fort with the bastion

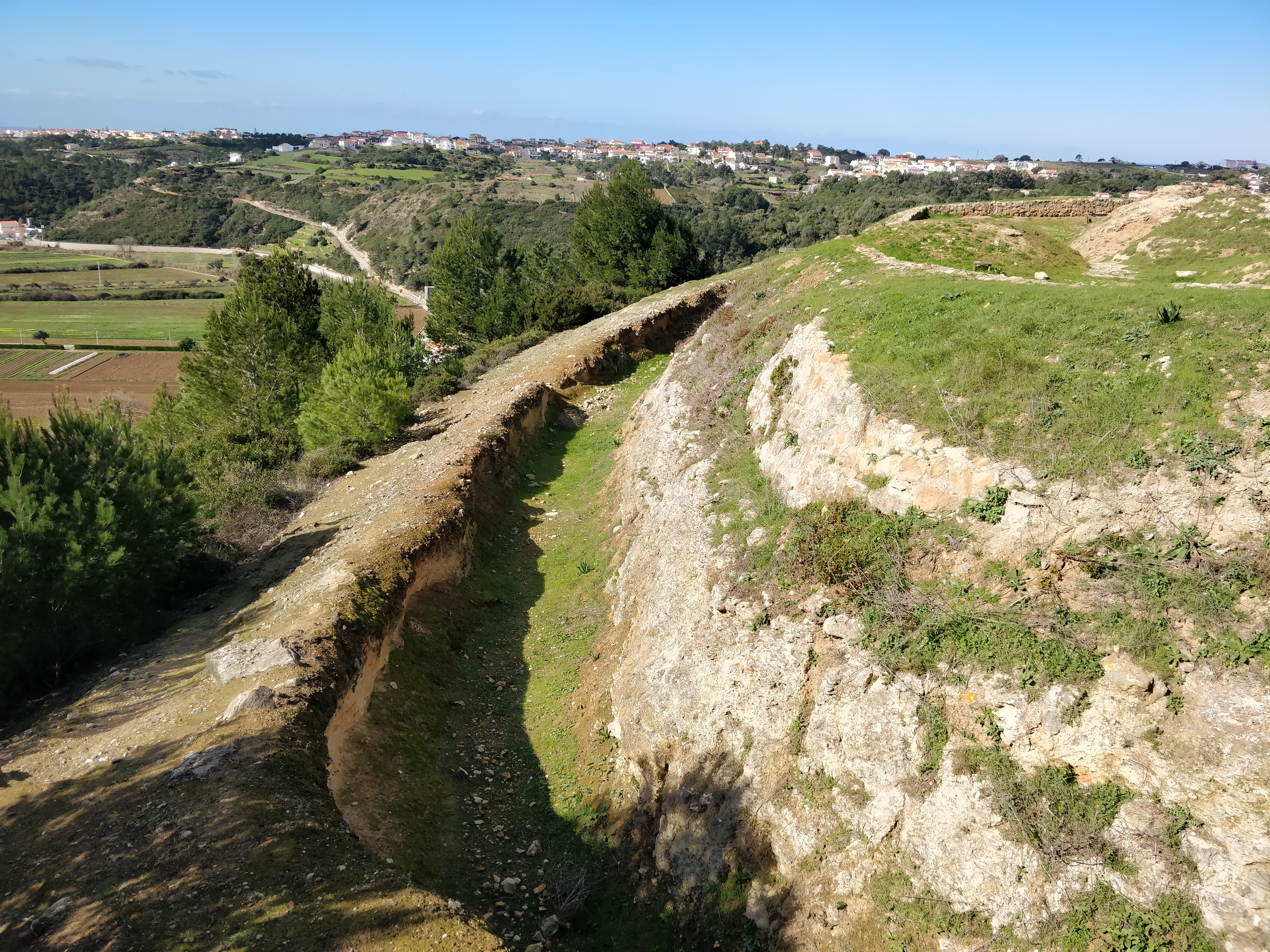
Fort of Zambujal moat

== See also ==
- List of forts of the Lines of Torres Vedras
