= Bucelas =

- Civil parish
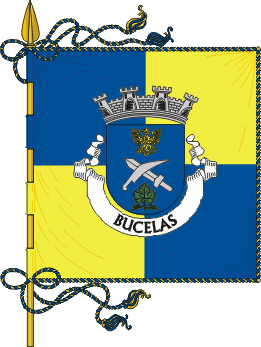
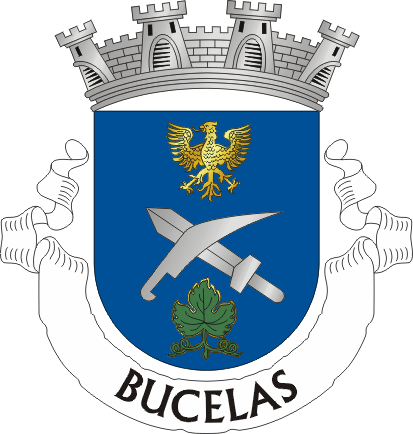
- Flag Coat of arms

- Location in Portugal
- Coordinates: 38.901°N 9.119°W
- Country: Portugal
- Region: Lisbon
- Metropolitan area: Lisbon
- District: Lisbon
- Municipality: Loures

Area
  - Total: 33.97 km^{2} (13.12 sq mi)

Population (2011)
  - Total: 4,663
  - Density: 137.3/km^{2} (355.5/sq mi)
- Time zone: UTC+00:00 (WET)
  - Summer (DST): UTC+01:00 (WEST)

Bucelas is a civil parish in the municipality of Loures, Portugal. The population in 2011 was 4,663, in an area of 33.97 km^{2} (13.12 sq mi).

The town is known for its Bucelas DOC wine. A museum in the centre of the town gives a good description of the history of the industry and also exhibits some of the equipment used. The museum also has a section devoted to the Lines of Torres Vedras, which were defensive lines built by Anglo-Portuguese forces in 1809–10 to protect Lisbon from invading French troops during the Peninsular War. Some of the forts close to Bucelas, such as the Fort of Arpim, the Fort of Ribas and the Fort of Ajuda Grande, have been restored.
