= Treaty of Fontainebleau (October 1807) =

1807 secret agreement between France and Spain to divide Portugal

The partition of Portugal, proposed by Napoleon under the 1807 Treaty of Fointainebleu.

The Treaty of Fontainebleau was a secret agreement signed on 27 October 1807 in Fontainebleau, France between King Charles IV of Spain and the French Emperor Napoleon. Under the treaty, the House of Braganza was to be driven from the Kingdom of Portugal with the country subsequently divided into three regions, the north and south to be ruled by Louis II, King of Etruria and Spanish minister Manuel Godoy respectively, while the provinces of Beira, Tras-os-Montes and Portuguese Estremadura would remain in abeyance until a later peace. Within seven months the government of Spain had collapsed and two Spanish kings abdicated. In August 1808 Napoleon imposed his brother Joseph as King of Spain.

Negotiated and agreed between Don Eugenio Izquierdo, plenipotentiary of Charles IV, and Marshal Géraud Duroc as the representative of Napoleon, the accord contained 14 articles along with supplementary provisions relating to troop allocations for the planned invasion of Portugal. According to historian Charles Oman, it is probable that Napoleon never had any intention of carrying out the treaty's provisions. Aside from his desire to occupy Portugal, his real purpose may have been to surreptitiously introduce a large French force into Spain in order to facilitate its subsequent takeover.

== Background ==
After his attempt to invade Great Britain in 1806 failed, Napoleon decreed a Continental Blockade, which prohibited trade of British products throughout the European continent. Portugal, a traditional ally of England, refused to obey him. In order to invade Portugal, Napoleon required a route for his ground troops through Spain, necessitating a treaty with that country.

== Articles ==
=== Article 1 ===
The province of Entre-Douro-e-Minho along with the city of Porto to be ceded to the King of Etruria, with the title King of North Lusitania.

=== Article 2 ===
Under this section the province of Alentejo, along with the Kingdom of the Algarves were to be given to Manuel Godoy, Prime Minister of Spain and confidant of Charles IV's wife, Maria Luisa of Parma. Godoy, who was known as the Príncipe de la Paz (Prince of Peace), would also receive the title of Prince of the Algarves under the treaty. He was considered an "odious and disgraceful" man, casting doubt on whether Napoleon would have delivered such a prize to a man he described as "a horror of the nation". Instead, in Napoleon's own words, "he [Godoy] is a rascal who will open the gates of Spain for me".

=== Article 3 ===
Control of the provinces of Beira, Tras-os-Montes and Portuguese Estremadura would remain in abeyance until a general peace occurred, whereupon they would be disposed of according to a further agreement between the treaty parties.

=== Articles 4, 5, 6 and 7 ===
The Kingdom of Northern Lusitania would pass to the country's king of Etruria's descendants according to Spanish inheritance law as would the Principality of the Algarves. In the absence of legitimate heirs of either territory they would revert to the Spanish throne, without ever becoming united under one sovereign. Both entities would remain under the aegis of the Spanish king, and would be unable to make war or agree to peace without his consent.

=== Article 8 ===
In the event that the provinces of Beira, Tras-os-Montes, and Portuguese Extremadura were returned as part of a general peace to the House of Braganza in exchange for Gibraltar, Trinidad, and other colonies captured by the English, the new sovereign of these provinces would be bound to the king of Spain under the same terms as the King of the Northern Lusitania and the Prince of the Algarves detailed above.

=== Article 9 ===
The King of Etruria would cede his kingdom and all his property to the French Emperor.

=== Article 10 ===
Once the occupation of Portugal was complete, the different rulers would appoint commissioners to fix the actual borders between them.

=== Article 11 ===
All Spanish territory south of the Pyrenees would be guaranteed by the French.

=== Article 12 ===
The King of Spain would receive the title "King of the two Americas" within three years of the treaty.

=== Article 13 ===
Islands, colonies and other overseas properties of Portugal would be divided between Spain and France.

=== Article 14 ===
Confirmed that the treaty was secret and required ratification in the Spanish capital, Madrid, no more than 20 days after its signature.

== Supplementary terms ==
The troops to be assembled for the invasion consisted of 25,000 French infantry and 3,000 cavalry. Spain would provide 24,000 infantry, 30 guns and 3,000 cavalry. The Spanish cavalry, artillery and 8,000 infantry would join the French at Alcantara then march to Lisbon. Entre Minho e Douro and Oporto would be occupied by 10,000 Spanish infantry while 6,000 invaded Portuguese Extramadura and the Algarves. To counter any English interference or Portuguese opposition, 40,000 men would assemble at Bayonne.

== Aftermath ==
Junot's army entered Lisbon on 30 November, only to find the Portuguese royal family had departed for Brazil three days before where they would remain until 1821.

In 1808, France would launch a takeover in Spain, triggering the Peninsular War.

== See also ==
- French invasion of Portugal
- Timeline of the Peninsular War

== Notes ==
1. "C'est un gredin qui m'ouvrira lui-même les portes de l'Espagne", from Fouché's Mémoires, Volume I, page 365
