= La Bastida, Totana =

Argaric archaeological site in Totana, Murcia, Spain

La Bastida
- La Bastida de Totana
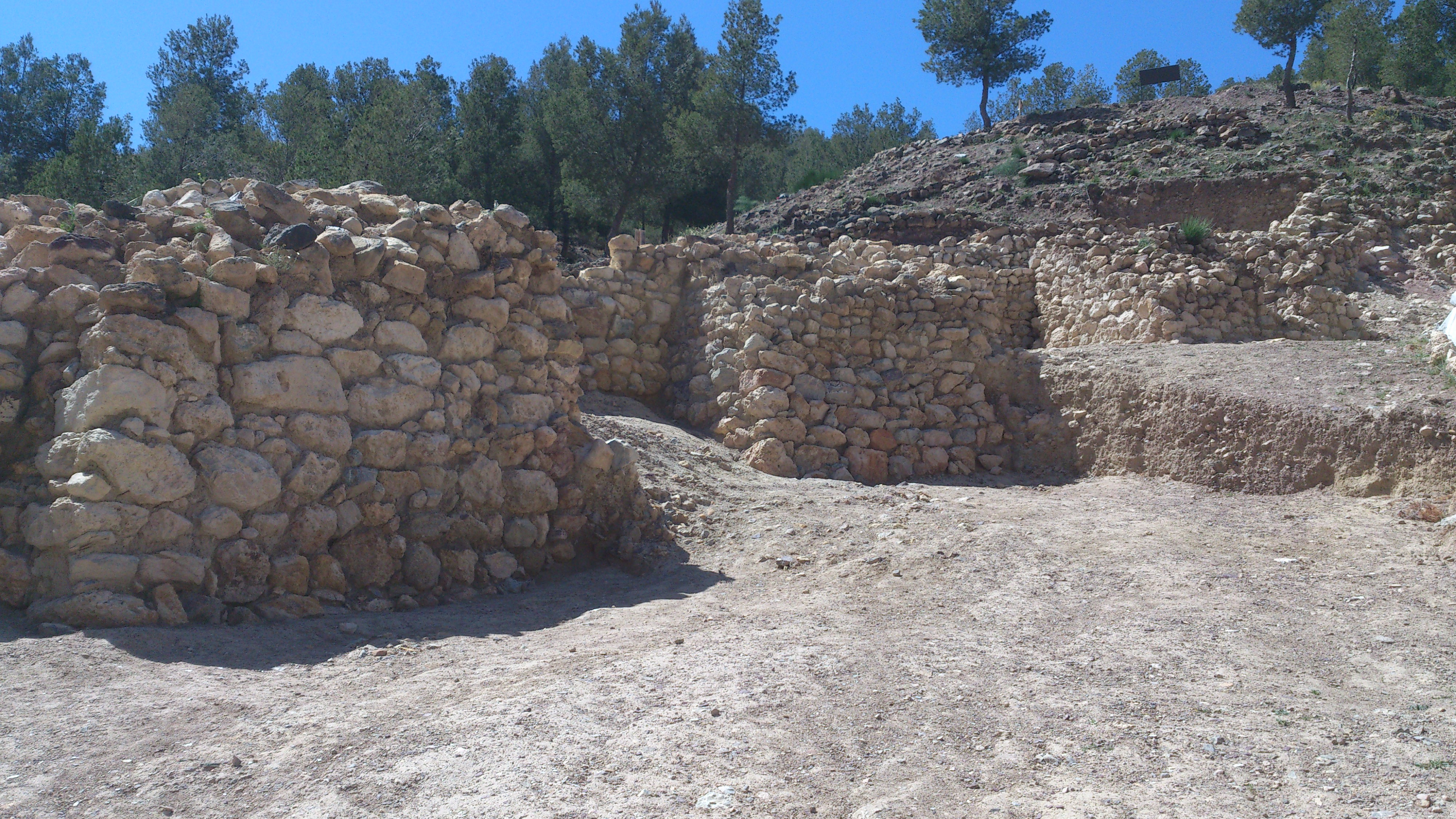
- State of the excavation of the wall in April 2013
- Type: Archaeological site
- Periods: Bronze Age
- Cultures: Argaric culture
- Location: Totana, Region of Murcia, Spain
- Region: Guadalentín Valley
- Part of: Argaric culture

History
- Built: Second half of the 3rd millennium BC
- Abandoned: Mid-2nd millennium BC

Site notes
- Area: 4.5 ha (11 acres)
- Condition: Excavated
- Public access: Yes
- Website: La Bastida

La Bastida de Totana is an archaeological site associated with the Argaric culture, located in the municipality of Totana, in the Region of Murcia, Spain. It is situated on a conical-shaped hill approximately 6 km west of Totana and was occupied between approximately 2200 and 1550 BC. It is one of the largest settlements (minimum estimate of 4.5 ha) from the early Bronze Age in continental Europe and is considered one of the most important settlements of recent European prehistory. It formed part of the network of Argaric central settlements, with early urban planning and evidence of political and economic inequalities.

In 2005, La Bastida was declared a Bien de Interés Cultural. Its long history of research, initiated in 1869, and the fieldwork conducted since 2008 by the Mediterranean Social Archaeoecology Research Group (ASOME) of the Autonomous University of Barcelona make it one of the best-known Argaric sites to date.

== Geography ==
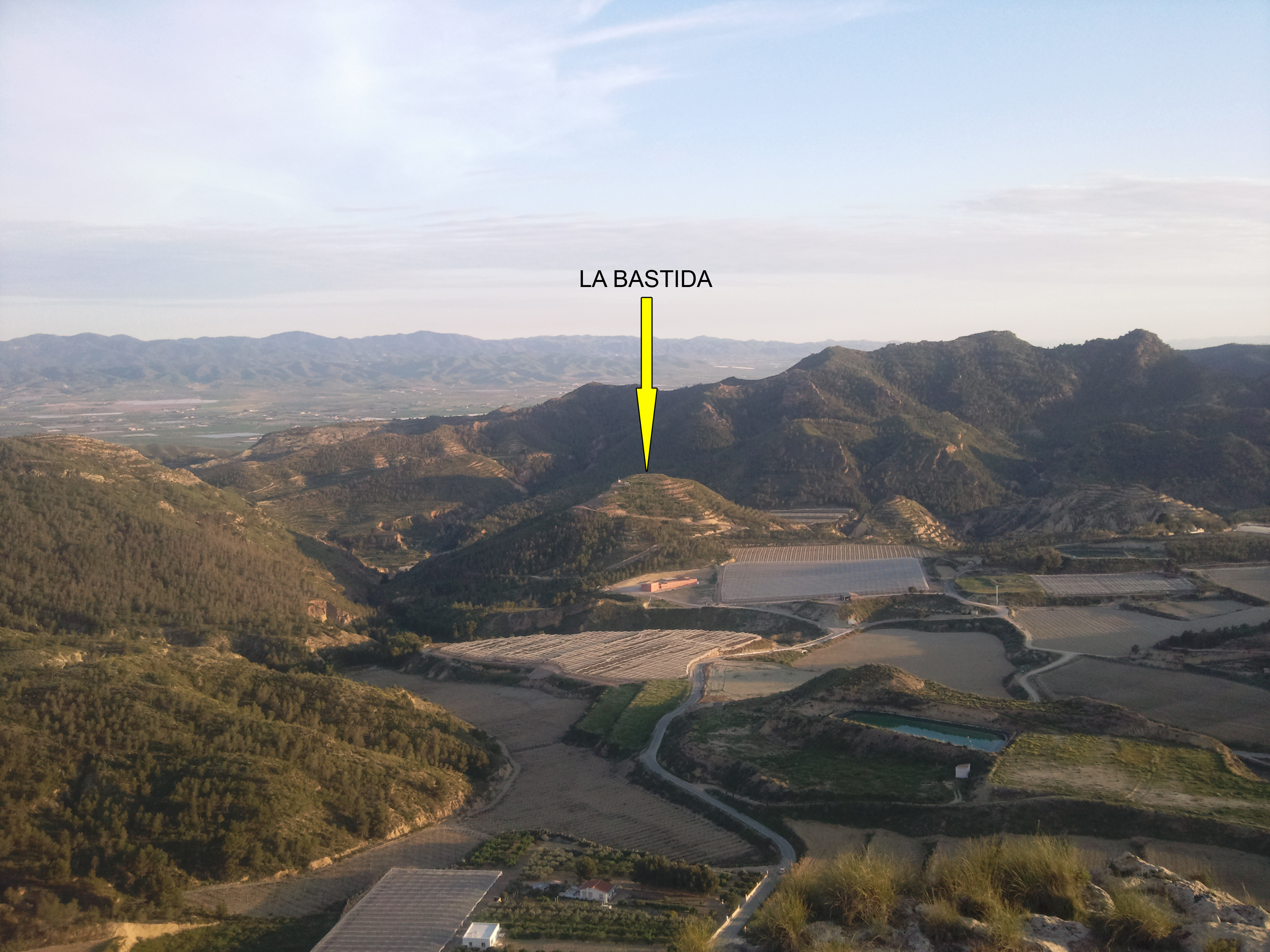
View of the northern side of La Bastida from Serrecica (2010)

La Bastida is located at the foothills of the La Tercia and Espuña mountains, on a steep hill at 450 meters above sea level, at the confluence of the Rambla de Lébor and the Barranco Salado.

Geologically, it lies at the contact zone between Miocene materials from the Sierra de la Tercia and Paleozoic and Mesozoic materials represented in the Sierra de Espuña. The geological substrate of the hill is mainly tertiary, with a predominance of conglomerates, marls, limestones, gypsum, and sandstones, with minor amounts of slate and quartzite.

During prehistoric times, the area had relatively dense riparian forests, but during the Argaric period, human activity led to irreversible environmental changes. Continuous deforestation over nearly 700 years for fuel, agriculture, and livestock grazing caused environmental degradation, which was exacerbated in historical periods.

The current landscape is heavily degraded due to ongoing environmental impact. Periodic torrential rains have led to significant erosion in the Lébor and Salado waterways. Additionally, forest exploitation and later reforestation with Aleppo pine in the 1970s altered the natural flora and topography through terracing, creating an arid environment characterized by scrubland and small shrubs.

La Bastida is situated at the edge of the Guadalentín Valley, yet remains relatively secluded from the alluvial plains. This location likely played a key role in the settlement's political and economic significance within the Argaric society.

== Archaeological Interventions ==
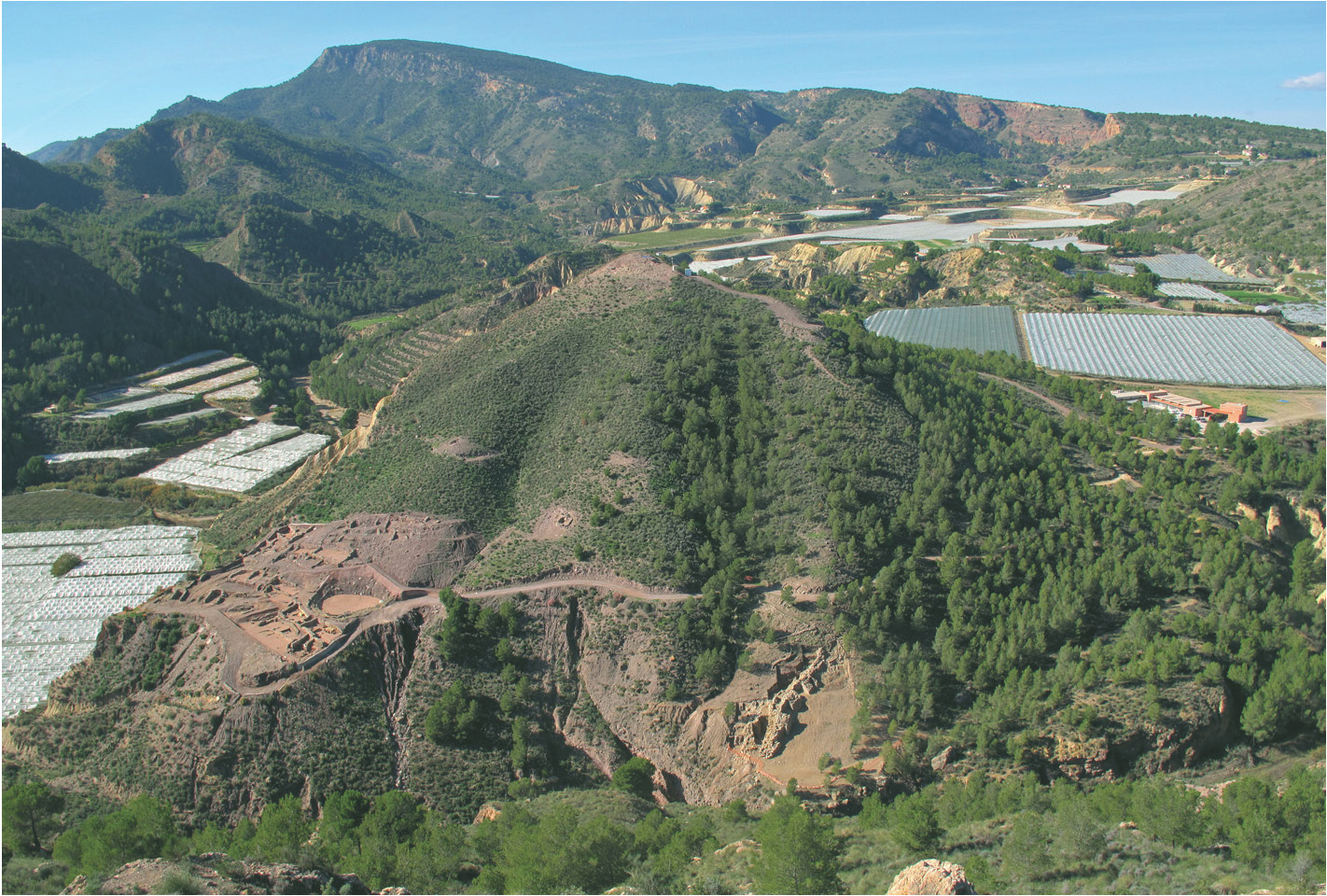
Site of La Bastida de Totana fortified town.

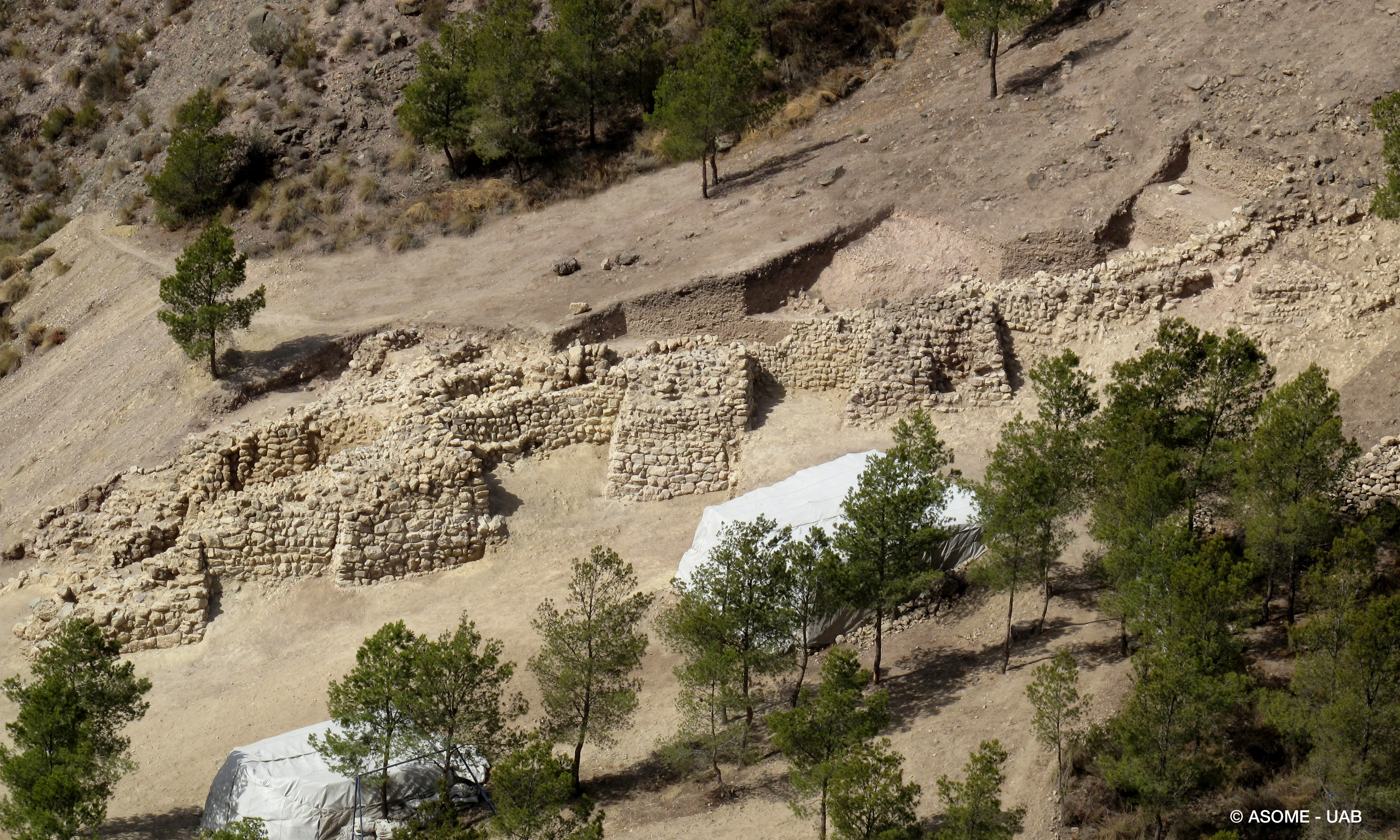
Remains of fortifications at La Bastida de Totana

La Bastida was the first Argaric settlement to be excavated, studied, and published in detail. The first recorded excavation took place in 1869 under the direction of civil engineer Rogelio de Inchaurrandieta, who presented his findings at the 1869 International Congress of Archaeology in Copenhagen. Over three days, with the help of 18 workers, he excavated 18 urns and 2 cist graves. His findings were published in the Boletín de la Universidad de Madrid (1870) and in the Actas del Congreso de Copenhague (1875), where he made initial interpretations of economic activities and funerary practices at La Bastida.

Since then, numerous excavations, surveys, and restoration efforts have been conducted by various researchers. However, the level of documentation and methodological rigor has varied. This long research history has also resulted in a dispersion of archaeological finds, many of which are now housed in different European museums.

In 1886, Luis Siret and Pedro Flores excavated at the site after reading Inchaurrandieta's report. They ceased their work after excavating the thirteenth tomb, possibly due to lack of expected findings.

During the 20th century, further excavations were carried out, including those by Juan Cuadrado, a disciple of Siret, between 1927 and 1939. His findings were donated to the Archaeological Museum of Almería, where he served as director until his death in 1952.

After a period of neglect, new excavations began in the 21st century, led by the Autonomous University of Barcelona. These efforts aim to reconstruct the site's urban structure and understand its role within the Argaric society.

== See also ==
- La Almoloya in Pliego

== Gallery ==
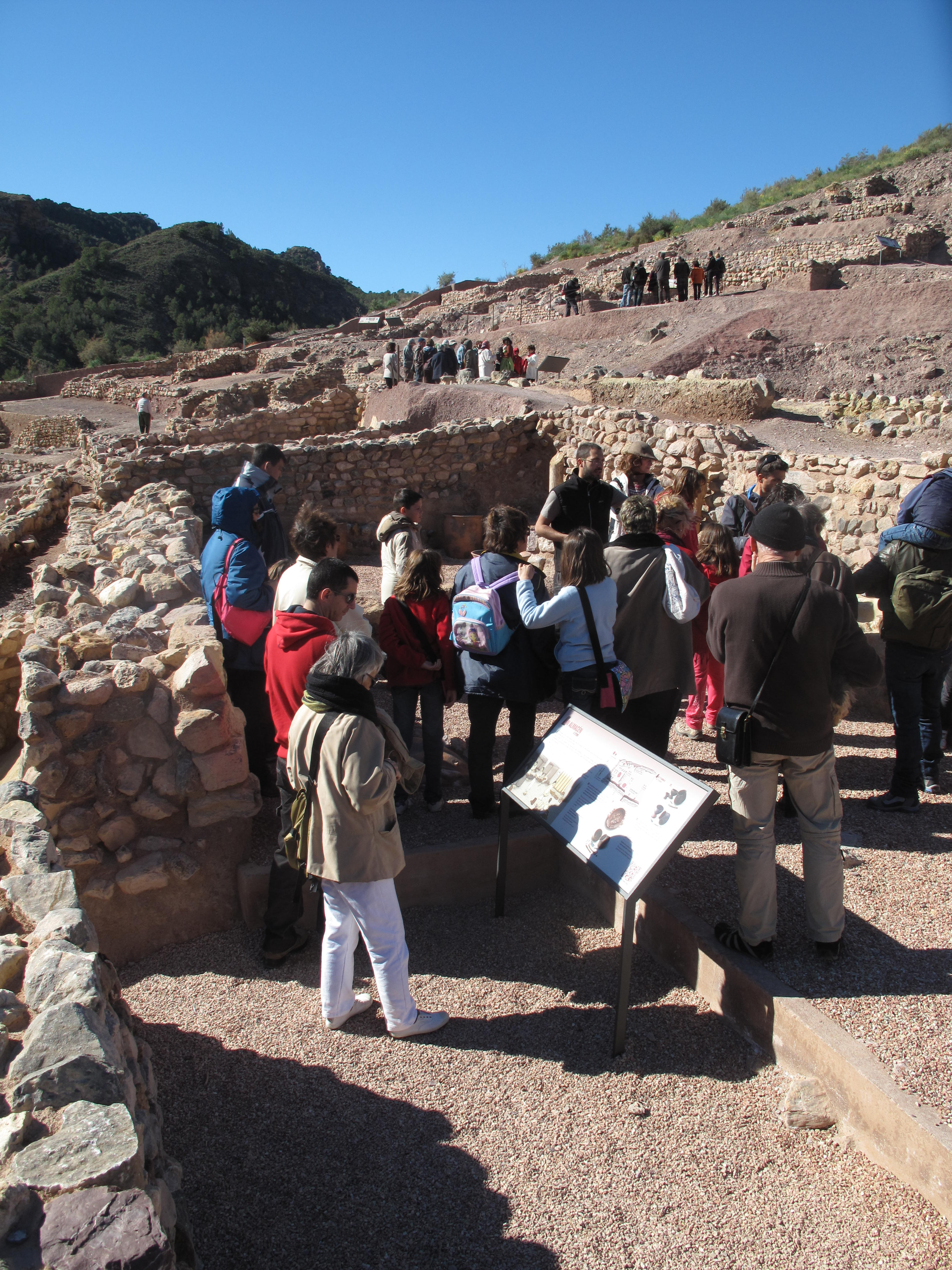
La Bastida Totana archaeological site

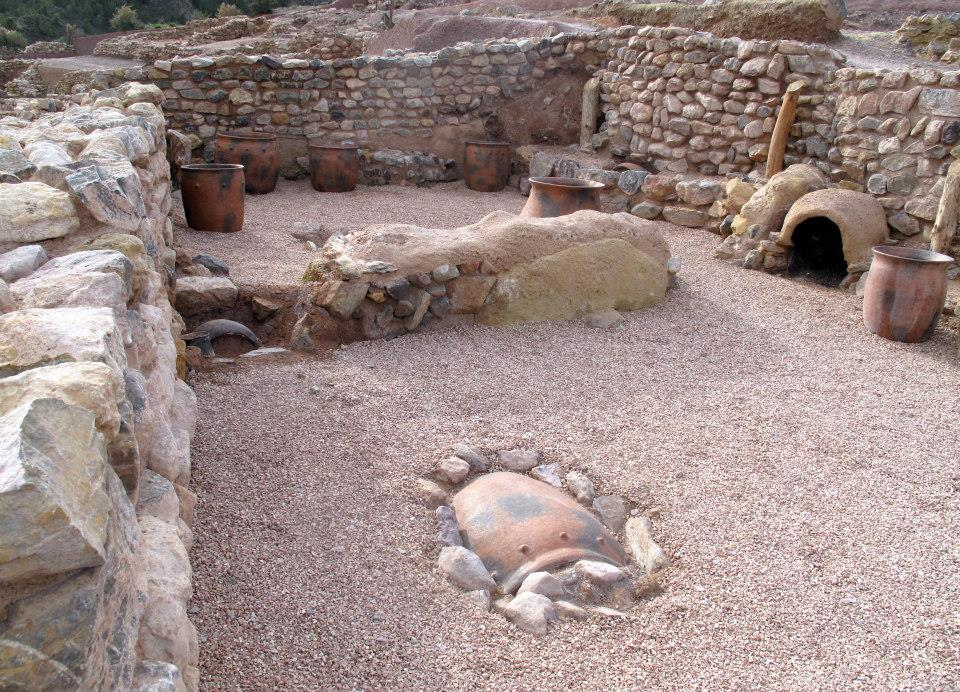
Remains of a house at La Bastida Totana
