= Totana =

- Municipality
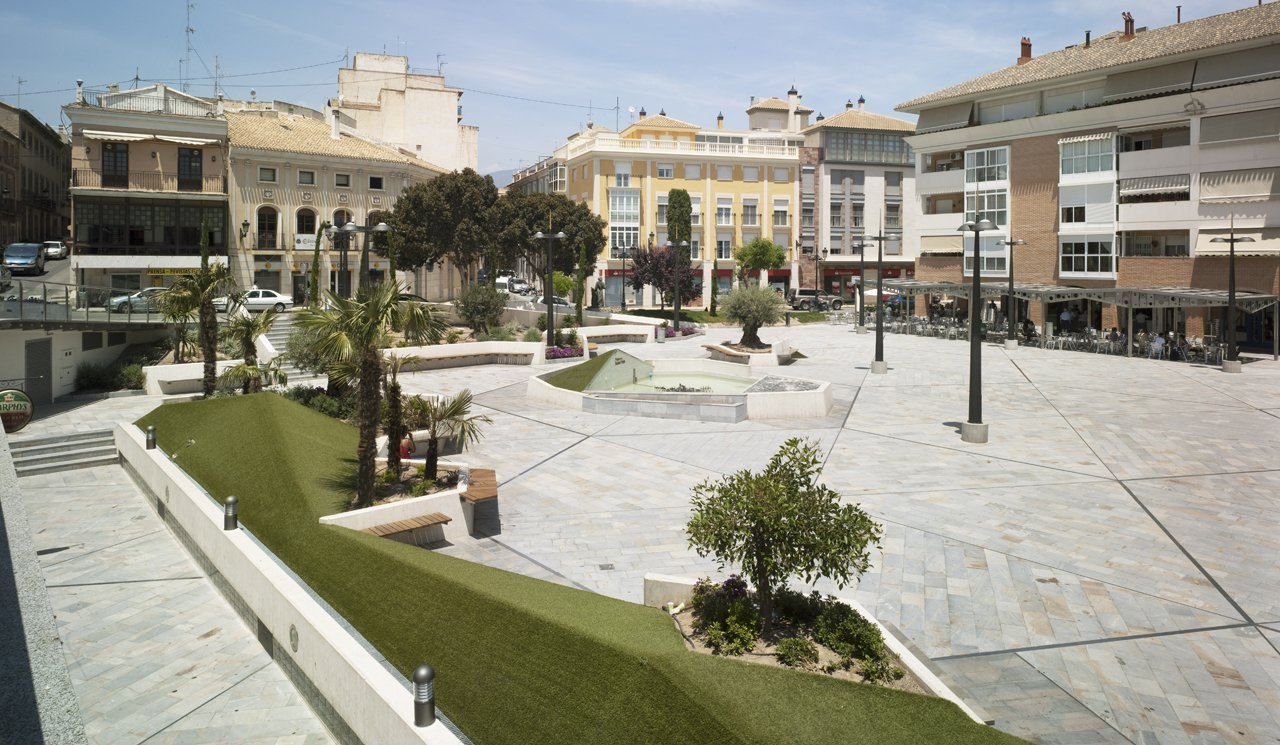

- Flag Coat of arms

- Location in Murcia

- Location in Murcia Location in Spain
- Country: Spain
- A. community: Murcia
- Province: Murcia
- Comarca: Bajo Guadelentín
- Judicial districy: Totana

Government
  - Mayor: Pedro José Sánchez Pérez (IU)

Area
  - Total: 287.67 km^{2} (111.07 sq mi)
- Elevation: 255 m (837 ft)

Population (2025-01-01)
  - Total: 33,358
  - Density: 115.96/km^{2} (300.33/sq mi)
- Demonym: totanero.ra
- Website: Official website

Totana is a municipality in the Region of Murcia in Spain. It has a population of 32008. The local economy is largely dependent on agriculture and related industries. It has a railway station providing a service on the Cercanías Murcia/Alicante commuter line, providing connections to Alicante and Murcia.

== History ==
=== Prehistory and Ancient history ===
This current municipality has been inhabited from the Prehistory, specifically from the Middle Palaeolithic, but during the Upper Palaeolithic Totana it was already occupied by humans.

During the Chalcolithic there was also human presence, for example a settlement named Poblado del Campico de Lébor. Archaeological remains in that area are mainly holes, which could have been silos, and stone implements such as arrow tips and sickles.

In the Bronze Age there are noteworthy archaeological remains about a settlement of the Argaric civilization in La Bastida. There were people in that town from 1,675 BC to 1100 BC. Its maximum population consisted of 600-800 inhabitants and it took place about 1550 BC.

During the late Bronze Age, people moved from the settlement because of a crisis that was caused by a lack of foodstuff for all the inhabitants of La Bastida. They started to populate a new settlement named Las Cabezuelas.

Remains about the Iberian era have been found in Las Cabezuelas. These consist mainly of ceramic objects and wall plinths belonging to little-sized rooms, with regular allocation and ordinary masonry.

This archaeological area has also remains from the Roman Hispania era. These are mainly ceramic objects and walls with opus africanum masonry.

=== Middle Ages and Early modern period ===
During Al Andalus (or Islamic Spain era) the archaeological area was inhabited. Remains of that fact such as ceramic materials, stone wall plinths, support this assumption.

Between 1238 and 1243, the Taifa of Murcia came under increasing pressure from the powerful kingdoms of Castile, Aragon and Granada. There was also considerable internal instability. King Ibn Hud decided to make Castile a vassal state.

In April 1243, the Treaty of Alcaraz, recognising the sovereignty of Castile, was signed. Alfonso X of Castile designated his brother Manuel governor of the town council of Aledo, and consequently ruled the town of Totana, which was a suburb of Aledo.

The lack of geographic roughness, which could give defence to Totana, and the lack of structures for defence purposes, caused the village to be a dangerous place for living due to Muslim raids. The locality was hardly populated during 14th and 15th centuries and people used it as a merchandising trade place.

Totana did not obtain the status of villa before the last years of the Reconquista. People started to exit the enclosed by a wall town of Aledo and move to plain lands, to the suburb of Totana from the year 1492.

During the last decades of the Low Middle Ages and the first decades of the Modern period, the number of inhabitants was growing and Totana was expanding. With the purpose of ceasing people to move to Totana, the major of Aledo forbade house building in Totana except for the buildings for labourers. People did not take the notice of the order and even the major, councilors, wealthy people and the parish moved there during the following years.

In the Early Modern Period there was a new urban structure that was created and two new neighbourhoods were settled: Sevilla and Triana. In Sevilla, there were quite religious buildings and the paths to Murcia, Cartagena, Lorca and Mazarrón. In Triana, there were the salaried workers dwellings.

Throughout the 16th century, several plague epidemics took place in the Region of Murcia and it also took presence in Totana. The people of the town suffered famine and some unfortunate weather events.

The 18th century was an apogee era for Totana, as well as for the Region of Murcia. Totana supported Philip II of Spain during the War of the Spanish Succession. As Philip II got the crown, the town was awarded with the 'Noble' status in 1709.

Two new hydraulic structures were constructed. There were several aesthetic architectonic works such as the facade of the Parish Church of Santiago and a fountain named Fuente Monumental.

=== Late modern period and Contemporary era ===
In the census of 1755, 2303 people were listed and 201 members among those people lived in Aledo.

In the year 1795 Totana and Aledo were separated and became two municipalities.

The first years of the 19th century consisted of misfortune for the inhabitants of Lorca. 1802, a reservoir in Lorca got broken. Six years later War was proclaimed. Totana was not invaded by the French and young male locals battled in the front against the invaders. In the year 1810 an epidemic of yellow fever spread and it caused to die half of the population of the town.

During the mid-19th century, the crisis began to be overcome in Totana. The agriculture of the municipality was expanded and neighbourhoods formed.

The last third of the century was not prosperous for the town and there was high emigration among its inhabitants.

In the first years of the 20th century, a politician named Ángel Aznar y Butigeig was responsible that Totana was awarded the status of town by Alfonso XIII of Spain with a legal provision.

A large decrease in the population of Totana happened during the 1930s as a result of the lack of water. As non-irrigated lands became irrigated and new products began to be grown, the prosperity returned.

After the postwar period, Totana experienced a high development during the 1960s. The town expanded to the south, two new neighbourhoods were set because peasants from villages of Lorca migrated to the town. In the 1980s other new neighbourhoods came to existence.

On 2022, the mayor Juan José Cánovas (IU) died due to COVID-19.

== Geography ==
=== Physical geography ===
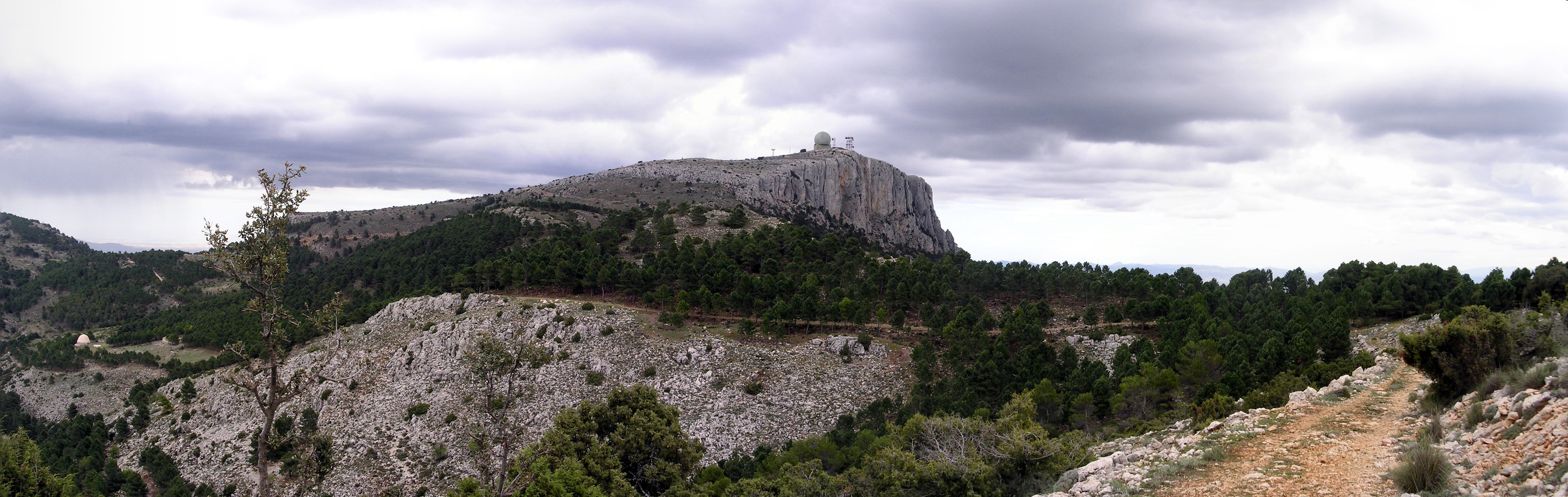
Morrón de Espuña, mountain lanform in Totana

Totana is located in the Southeast quadrant of Region of Murcia. The municipality shares borders with Mula at its north, with Alhama at its east, with Mazarrón and Lorca at its south and with Lorca and Aledo at its west.

The Murcia pre-coastal depression or Guadalentín Valley stretches partly in the southern half of the territory. As this depression is traversed by Guadelentín River that water bed crosses the municipality.

A geographic roughness which extents Totana is a mountain range named Sierra Espuña. This is part of the Baetic System.

=== Human geography ===
The number of inhabitants of the municipality consisted of 31,630 in the year 2018, and they are distributed in the following localities: Totana with 27,202 inhabitants; Paretón, whose population consists of 1500; Lébor, where 603 people live, Ñorica, whose number of inhabitants is 467 and Raiguero, which has 261 residents.

== Demographics ==
20.48% of the inhabitants are foreigners - 2.09% from other countries of Europe, 5.68% are Africans, 12.29% are Americans, and 129 Asian people reside there. The table below shows an evolution of the population during the 20th and 21st centuries decades.

| | 1900 | 1910 | 1920 | 1930 | 1940 | 1950 | 1960 | 1970 | 1981 | 1991 | 2001 | 2011 |
|---|---|---|---|---|---|---|---|---|---|---|---|---|
| Population | 13,714 | 14,235 | 14,211 | 13,842 | 15,453 | 14,718 | 14,424 | 16,300 | 18,357 | 20,466 | 24,657 | 30,773 |

== Economy ==
Agriculture is an economy activity that is quite carried out in the municipality. 29.9% of the territory surface is used for landcrops purposes. The most widely grown products are cauliflower, broccoli and grapes. 50.91% of the agreements were about agricultural labouring. Almost 42.9% of agreements were related to the tertiary sector in 2019 and 20.75% about waiter jobs in the first half of 2016.

== Healthcare ==
This municipality is part of the Healtharea III (Lorca) in Region of Murcia. Two of the eleven subareas stretch Totana - one is in the north and another is in the south. A consultorio (primary care centre with fewer functions than the centros de salud) and two centros de salud - one in the northern subarea and the other in the southern subarea.

== Education ==
The main town hosts 6 early childhood and primary education (CEIP) centres and 2 secondary education centres (IES). There are also a CEIP in Lébor and another in El Paretón. 4 basic vocational education degrees (FPB), 3 medium education degrees and one higher education degree. They are taught in the two IES.

A centre of the national language teaching institution can also be found in the territory as well as an adult education centre. Another institution is about several courses, its name is Universidad Popular and it belongs to the towncouncil.

== Main sights ==
These buildings have special history or artistic values:

- La Bastida: This is an archaeological site that was formerly a settlement of people belonging to the Argaric culture during the Bronze Age.
- Santiago Parish Church: Large of the current building emerged in the third quarter of the 16th century and its construction is due to the increase in the population. The façade has a baroque style. A nave and two aisles are part of the plant, as well as some chapels. There is a mudejar ceiling in the inner part.
- San José Church: This building was constructed in the late 17th century. It is composed of only a rectangular-shaped nave and covered with semicircular vault.
- San Roque Church: It was built in the 18th century. The plant of the building consists only in a rectangular-shaped nave. It has a gable roof.
- Town Hall: It was constructed during the 16th century. The building was remodelled in the 19th century and restored in 1990.
- Casa de Las Contribuciones: It was built in the early 20th century and has modernist features.
- Arco de San Pedro / Arco de Las Ollerías / Arco de la Rambla: This is an aqueduct which dates back to 1753.
- Santa Eulalia de Mérida Sanctuary

== Festivities ==
These are the main festivities of the municipality:

- Patron Saint Festivity: This festivity is consecrated to James the Great and it is held during July.
- Saint Eulalia of Mérida Festivity: This festivity is due to the Saint Eulalia of Mérida, who a symbol of the comarca (Region) Bajo Guadalentín. This festive event starts on the last Friday of November and its ending day is different and dependent of the year - sometimes it is the second Sunday of December or the third . Activities and events that are currently taken out during these days are a race on 6 Demeber (when the Constitution of Spain is commemorated); contests, specially about pétanque, artistic roller skating; music performances, tours to the archaeological site La Bastida and chocolate tasting events.
- Holy Week: The Holy Week in the town is held similarly to other places in Spain, but there are some special features. One of them is that people wear a black tunic when they appear in processions.
- Festive religious pilgrim (on 7 January):On 7 January, the statue that represents the Virgin Mary is carried back to the sanctuary where it was before it was taken out on 8 December. The statue is moved on a float throne.
- Mark the Evangelist festivity

=== Festivities in localities of the municipality ===
There are some festivities held in villages of the municipality below:

- Lébor festivity:This festivity is consecrated to Saint Peter and is held at the weekend which includes 30 June. The festivity is opened with a rocket set off. Other activities are music group performances, a procession (festive religious parade) and the typical village fried egg contests. The finale action of the festive days is firework display with typical Spanish structure and procedure named 'castillo' (castle).
- La Ñorica district festivity: Unlike most villages and localities in general in Spain, La Ñorica has not its own patron saint. Therefore, there is not any patron saint festivities in contrast with many places in Spain, whose main festivities are patron saint ones. As Ñorica have not had traditional and historic celebrations, their event has recently been introduced.
- La Huerta district festivity: This festivity is consecrated to the 'Virgin of the vegetable-patches' (Virgen de las huertas), in other words, it is consecrated to the Virgin Mary in facet in which she is related to the vegetable patches. The festivity takes place in a weekend that includes 8 September, or in the closest to 8 September weekend. On the first day there is a procession (festive religious parade) devoted to the 'Virgin of the vegetable patches', next a mass is held. On the second day a verbena takes place and on the last day of the festive days there is a mass that includes a music performance of a local band and mass picnic event.
- La Sierra district festivity: The reason for the festivity is the tribute to Leocadia. It is usually held on the third weekend of September. On the first festive day there is a contest of a Spanish and Portuguese typical dish named migas and next there is a music performance. On the second day there is a procession (festive religious parade) and next a verbena takes place while on the last day, a mass paella eating event occurs. In some years special activities are also carried out in Sierra Espuña (a mountain range).

== Sports ==
Totana has one football team called Club Olímpico de Totana who play in the Tercera División, the fourth level of the Spanish football league system.

Another sport that takes place is rugby with the 'Club de Rugby de Totana' (CRT). This association often participates in festivities of Totana, specifically in Saint Eulalia and James the Great patron saint festivities.

There are 2 multisports outdoors areas, a pavilion, a sports complex, some paddle courts, a football pitch and a municipality gymnasium in the main town. In Lébor a soccer pitch can be found.

== Sister city ==
- Kalocsa, Hungary
