= Argaric culture =

Culture of southern Spain, 2200–1550 BCE

Coordinates: 37.2521°N 1.9175°W

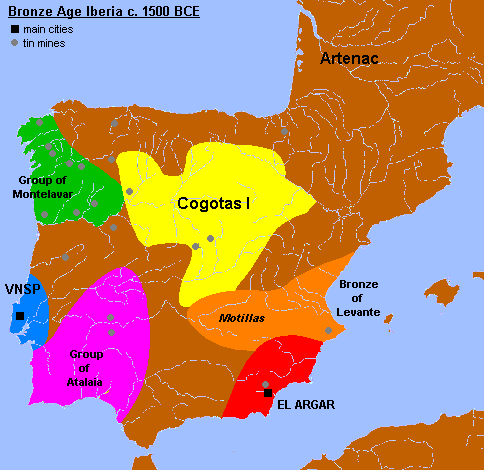
- Geographical range: Southeast Spain
- Period: Bronze Age
- Dates: c. 2200 — c. 1300 BC
- Major sites: El Argar, La Bastida de Totana
- Preceded by: Bell Beaker culture, Millaran culture
- Followed by: Motillas, Levantine Bronze Age, Post-Argar, Cogotas culture

The Argaric culture, named from the type site El Argar near the town of Antas, in what is now the province of Almería in southeastern Spain, is an Early Bronze Age culture which flourished between c. 2200 BC and 1550 BC.

The Argaric culture was characterised by its early adoption of bronze, which briefly allowed this tribe local dominance over other, Copper Age peoples. El Argar also developed sophisticated pottery and ceramic techniques, which they traded with other Mediterranean tribes.

The civilization of El Argar extended to all the current-day Spanish province of Almería, north onto the central Meseta, to most of the region of Murcia and westward into the provinces of Granada and Jaén, controlling an area similar in size to modern Belgium.

Its cultural and possibly political influence was much wider. Its influence has been found in eastern and southwestern Iberia (Algarve), and it likely affected other regions as well.

Some authors have suggested that El Argar was a unified state.

The center of this civilization is displaced to the north and its extension and influence is clearly greater than that of its ancestor. Their mining and metallurgy were quite advanced, with bronze, silver and gold being mined and worked for weapons and jewelry.

Pollen analysis in a peat deposit in the Cañada del Gitano basin high in the Sierra de Baza suggests that the Argaric exhausted precious natural resources, helping bring about its own ruin. The deciduous oak forest that covered the region's slopes was burned off, leaving a tell-tale carbon layer, and replaced by the fire-tolerant, and fire-prone, Mediterranean scrub familiar under the names garrigue and maquis.

== Extension ==
=== Main Argaric towns ===
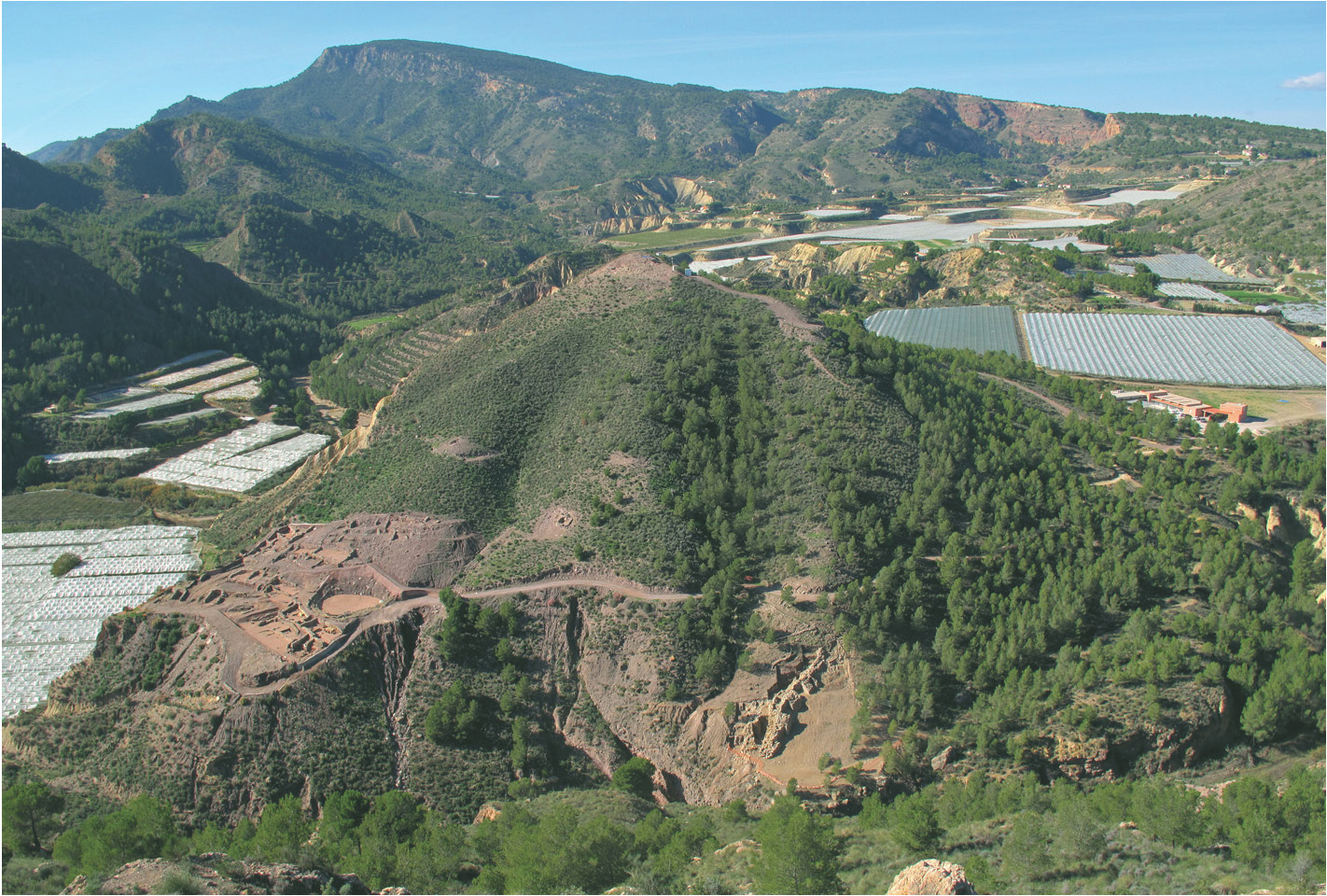
Site of La Bastida de Totana fortified town.

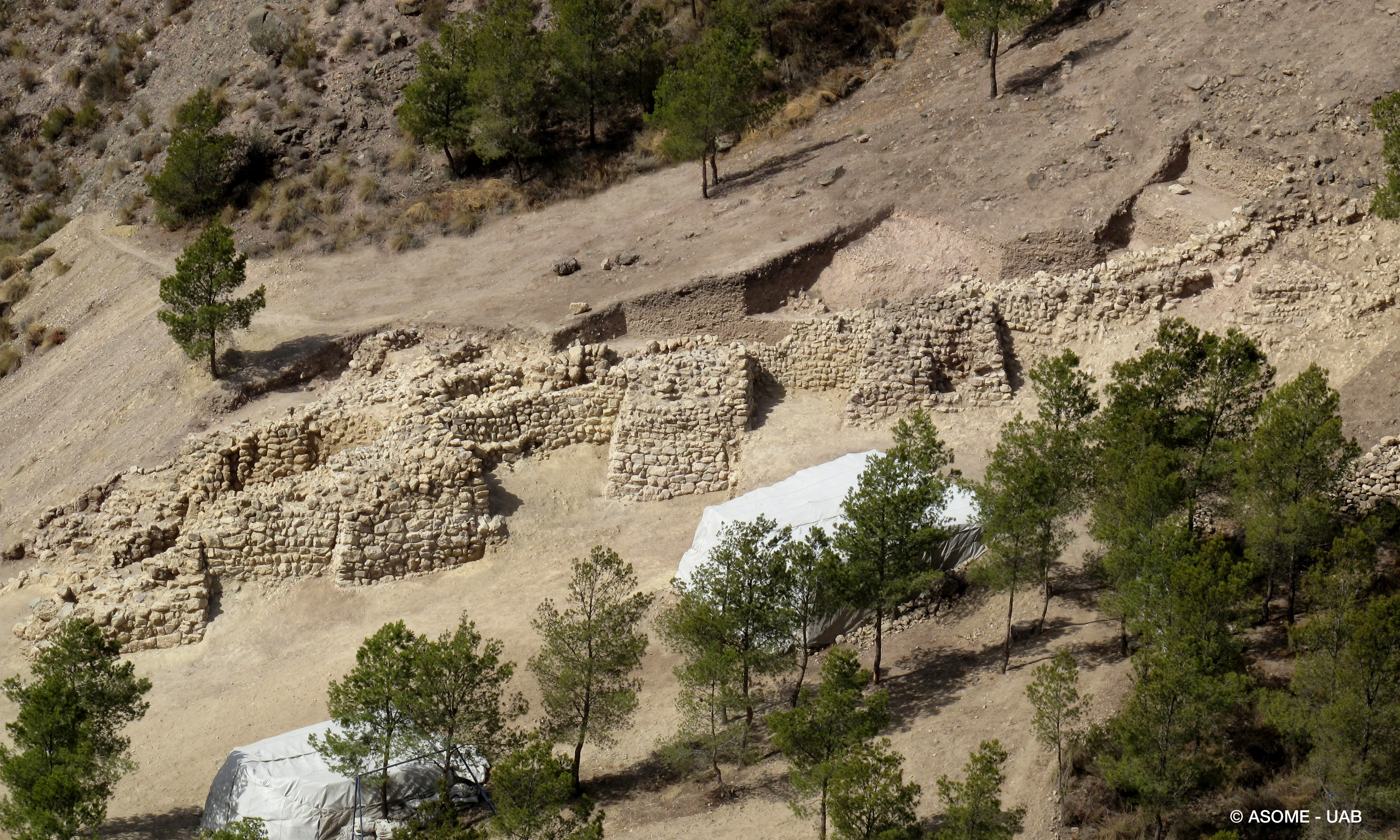
La Bastida de Totana, remains of the outer wall fortifications.

- El Argar: irregularly shaped (280 x 90 m).
- Fuente Vermeja: small fortified site, 3 km north of El Argar
- Lugarico Viejo: larger town very close to Fuente Vermeja.
- La Bastida de Totana: larger fortified site.

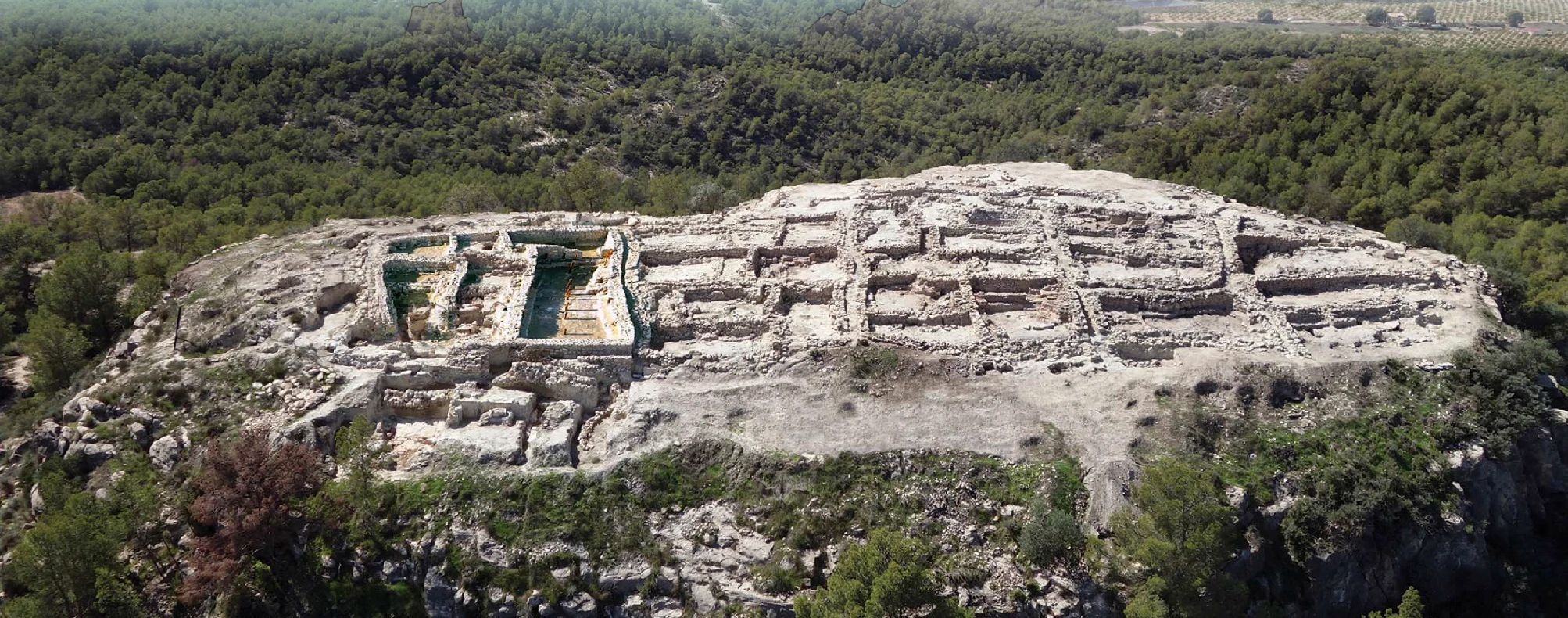
La Almoloya.

- La Almoloya (Pliego, Murcia): in the top of a plateau.
- Puntarrón Chico: in the top of a small hill, near Beniaján (Murcia)
- Ifre (Murcia): on a rocky elevation.
- Zapata (Murcia): 4 km. west of Ifre, fortified.
- Cabezo Redondo (Villena, Alicante): one of the biggest settlements, on a rocky elevation next to an old lagoon and salt evaporation pond.
- Gatas (4 km west of Mojácar, Almería): fortified town on a hill with remarkable water canalizations.
- El Oficio (9 km north of Villaricos, Almería): atop of a well defended hill, strongly fortified, especially towards the sea.
- Cerro de las Viñas, Coy, Spain
- Fuente Álamo (7 km north of Cuevas de Almazora, Almería): the citadel is atop a hill, while the houses are terraced in its southern slope.
- Almizaraque (Almería): a town dating to Los Millares civilization.
- Cerro de la Virgen de Orce (Granada).
- Cerro de la Encina (Monachil, Granada).
- Cuesta del Negro (Purullena, Granada).
- El Castellón Alto

== Material culture ==
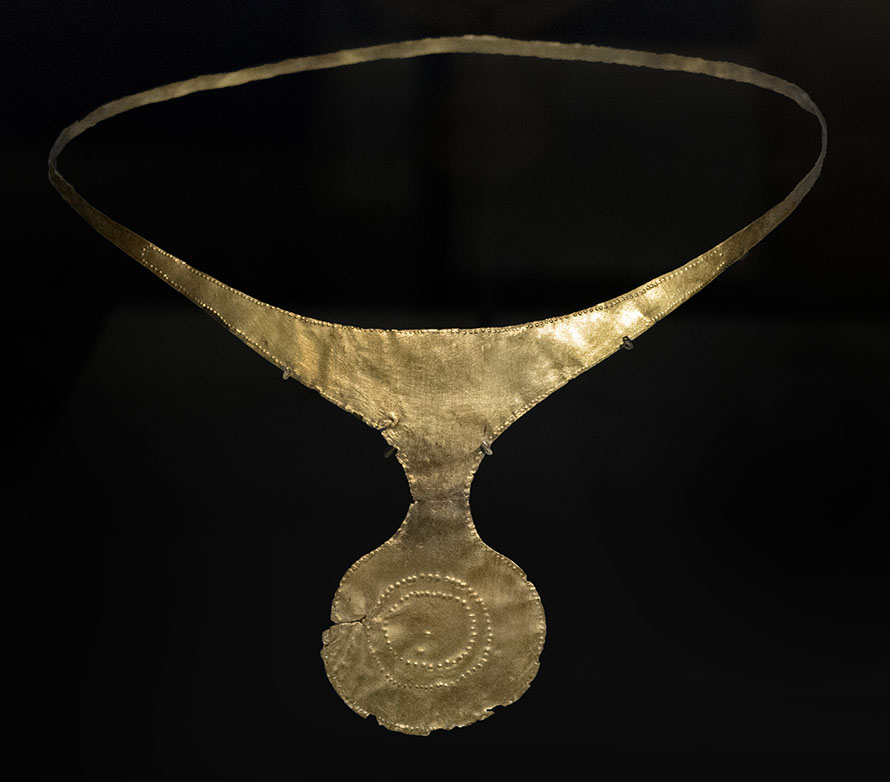
Gold diadem of Caravaca, c. 1600 BC.

=== Glass beads ===
A meaningful element are the glass beads (of blue, green and white colors) that are found in this culture and which have been related with similar findings in Egypt (Amarna), Mycenaean Greece (dated in the 14th century BC), the British Wessex culture (dated c. 1400 BC) and some sites in France. Nevertheless, some of these beads are already found in Chalcolithic contexts (site of La Pastora) which has brought some to speculate on an earlier date for the introduction of this material in southeast Iberia (late 3rd millennium BC).

=== Other manufactured goods ===
Pottery undergoes important changes, almost totally abandoning decoration and with new types.

Textile manufacture seems important, working specially with wool and flax. Basket-making also seems to have been important, showing greater extent and diversification than in previous periods.

== Funerary customs ==
The collective burial tradition typical of European Megalithic culture is abandoned in favor of individual burials. The tholos is abandoned in favour of small cists, either under the homes or outside. This trend seems to come from the Eastern Mediterranean, most likely from Mycenaean Greece (skipping Sicily and Italy, where the collective burial tradition remains for some time yet).

From the Argarian civilization, these new burial customs will gradually and irregularly extend to the rest of Iberia.

In the phase B of this civilization, burial in pithoi (large jars) becomes most frequent (see: Jar-burials). Again this custom (that never reached beyond the Argarian circle) seems to come from Greece, where it was used after. ca 2000 BC.

== Genetic profile ==
Out of 36 males tested from La Almoloya and La Bastida sites, 35 were assigned to haplogroup R1b-M269 (the exact phylogenetic position on the Y haplogroup tree could be resolved further in 14 males, who carry the derived variant at Y-SNP P312, and the derived subvariant Y-SNP Z195 in 18 males), only an individual was from another clade, E1b-L618. The Argar Culture was likely formed from a mixture of new groups arriving from north-central Iberia (which already carried the predominant Y-chromosome lineage and central European steppe-related ancestry) and local southeastern Iberian Copper Age groups that differed from other Iberian regions in that they carried an Iran Neolithic-like ancestry (similar to that found in eastern and/or central Mediterranean ancient groups). The major additional ancestry source resembled central European Bell Beaker groups, which first contributed ancestry to northern Iberia, followed by a southward spread. The distal sources were ~60% Anatolian farmer, ~25% Western Hunter-Gatherer, ~15% Yamnaya. Some phenotypìc traits were: absolute majority of brown eyes, pale skin was majoritary, and brown hair was more usual than black hair.

== Periodization ==
The culture of El Argar has traditionally been divided in two phases, named A and B.

=== El Argar A ===
Phase A started in the 18th century BC, with the earliest calibrated C-14 dates pointing to the first half of that century:

- 1785 BC (+/- 55 years) in the transitional Late Chalcolithic-Early Bronze of Cerro de la Virgen de Orce, a peripheral site
- 1730 BC (+/- 70 years) in Fuente Álamo for El Argar A2, with six undated A1 layers under it
- 1700 BC in Cuesta del Negro (another peripheral site) with identifiably Argarian materials in its lower layer

=== El Argar B ===
Phase B begins in the sixteenth century BC. The main C-14 date is that of 1550 BC (+/- 70 years) in Fuente Álamo for the upper layer of El Argar B2 (with four layers underneath the lowest B phase). Other stratigraphic dates are somewhat more recent, but are not confirmed by C-14.

=== Post-Argarian phase ===
El Argar B ends in the fourteenth or thirteenth century BC, giving way to a less homogeneous post-Argarian culture. Again, Fuente Álamo gives the best C-14 dating with 1330 BC (+/- 70 years).

=== Recent trends ===
Many more C-14 dates have been published since the beginning of the twenty-first century. In recent publications, at least 260 such dates are cited altogether. There is now a widespread consensus that the emergence of El Argar can be dated at 2200 cal BC, although its end remains somewhat disputed. Various opinions place the end of El Argar at 15th-14th centuries BC.

== Economy ==
Recent research suggests a link between drought and the cereals grown. In general, the cultivation of barley increased in the south of the Iberian Peninsula during the 4th and 3rd millennia BC, while the cultivation of wheat, which was initially dominant, decreased. Significant changes are associated with dry periods. However, during the very dry period between 1900 and 1600 BC, an increase in free-threshing wheat can be observed. This may be due to the fact that people in the neighbouring Motillas were already using groundwater to grow wheat. Through exchange, this grain also reached the settlements of the El-Argar culture.

Silver was also exploited. Gold had been abundantly used in the Chalcolithic period, but it became less common in El Argar culture. Discovery in 2014 of an especially rich grave and an associated building at La Almoloya have provided important details about the culture. The archaeological site is in a southeastern portion of the Iberian Peninsula. The richness of the burials of its women has led to some re-evaluation of the place of women in this Early Bronze Age culture.

== Gallery ==
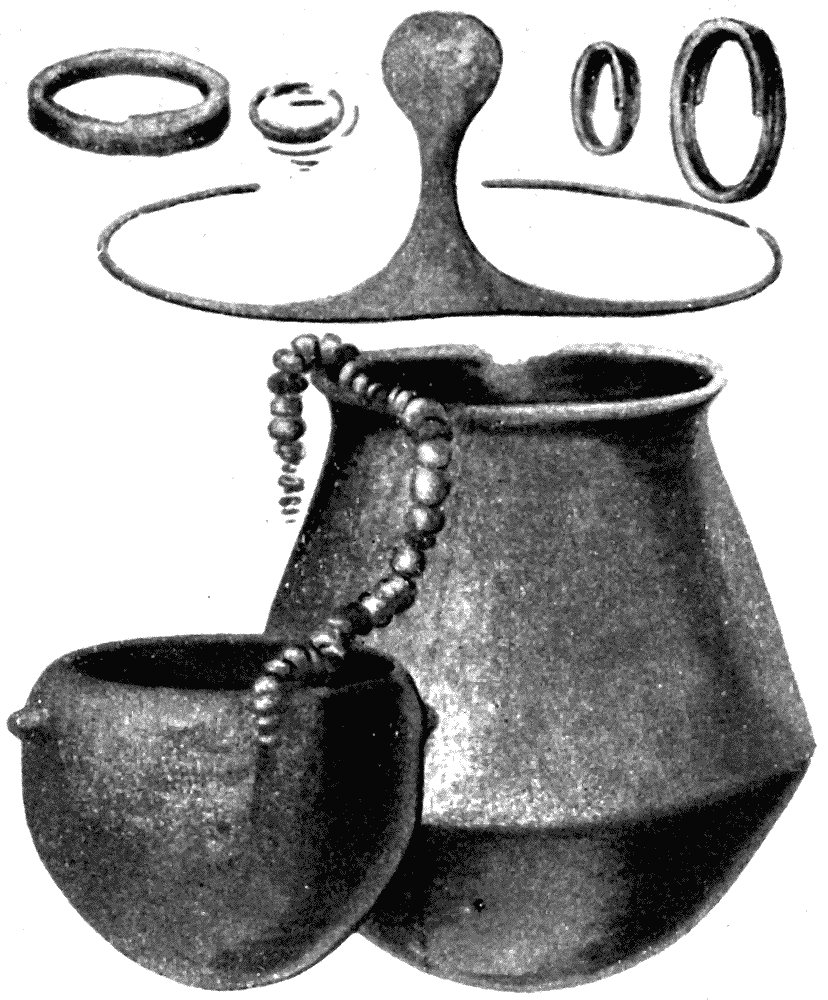
Grave goods

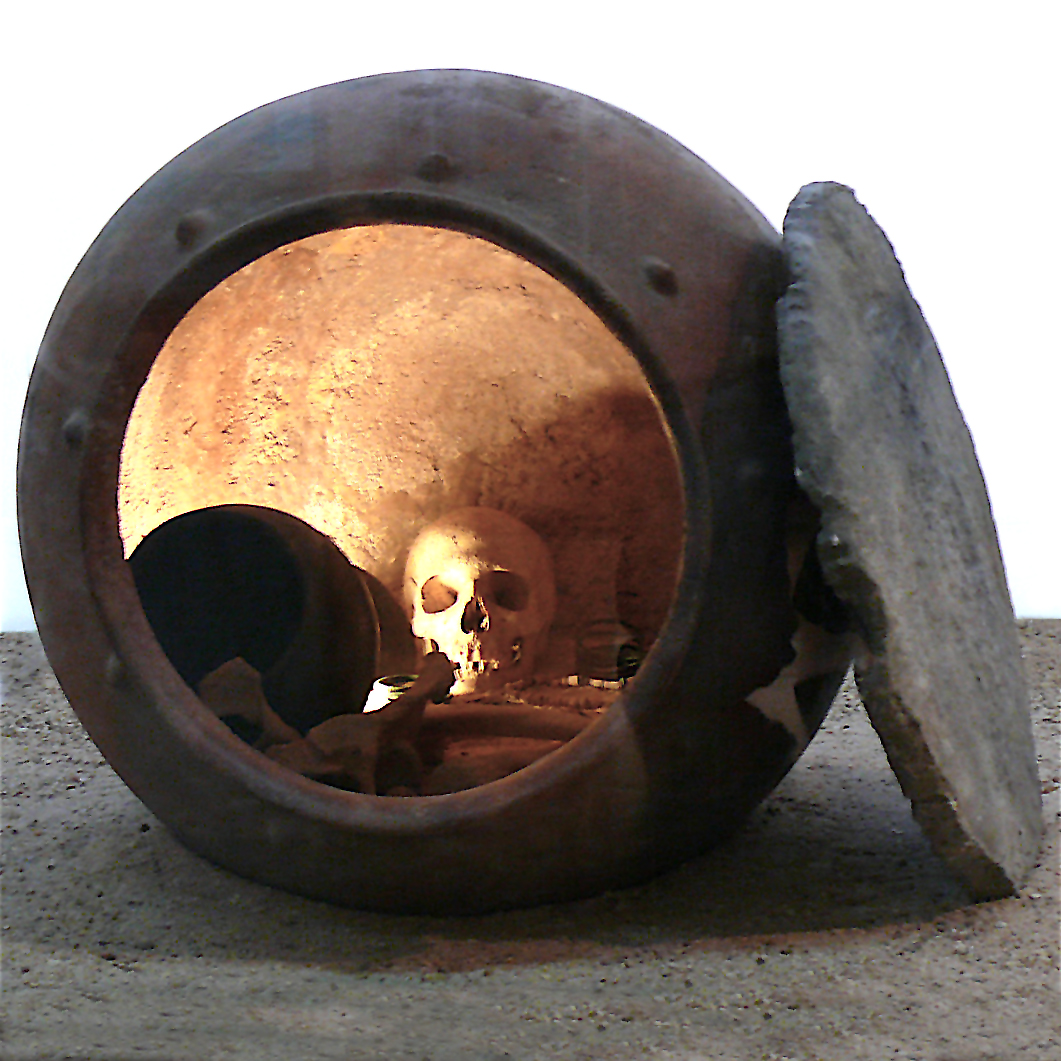
Typical jar burial
El Argar B

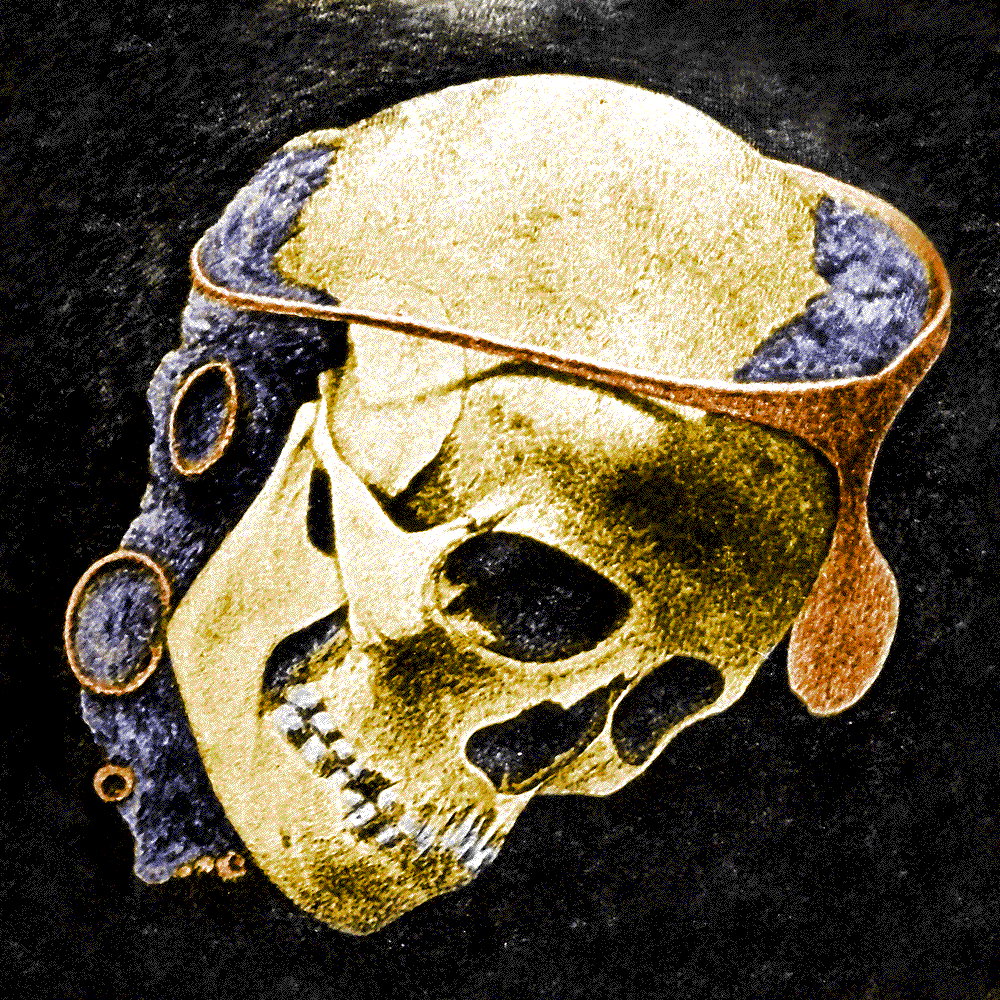
Woman's skull
with diadem

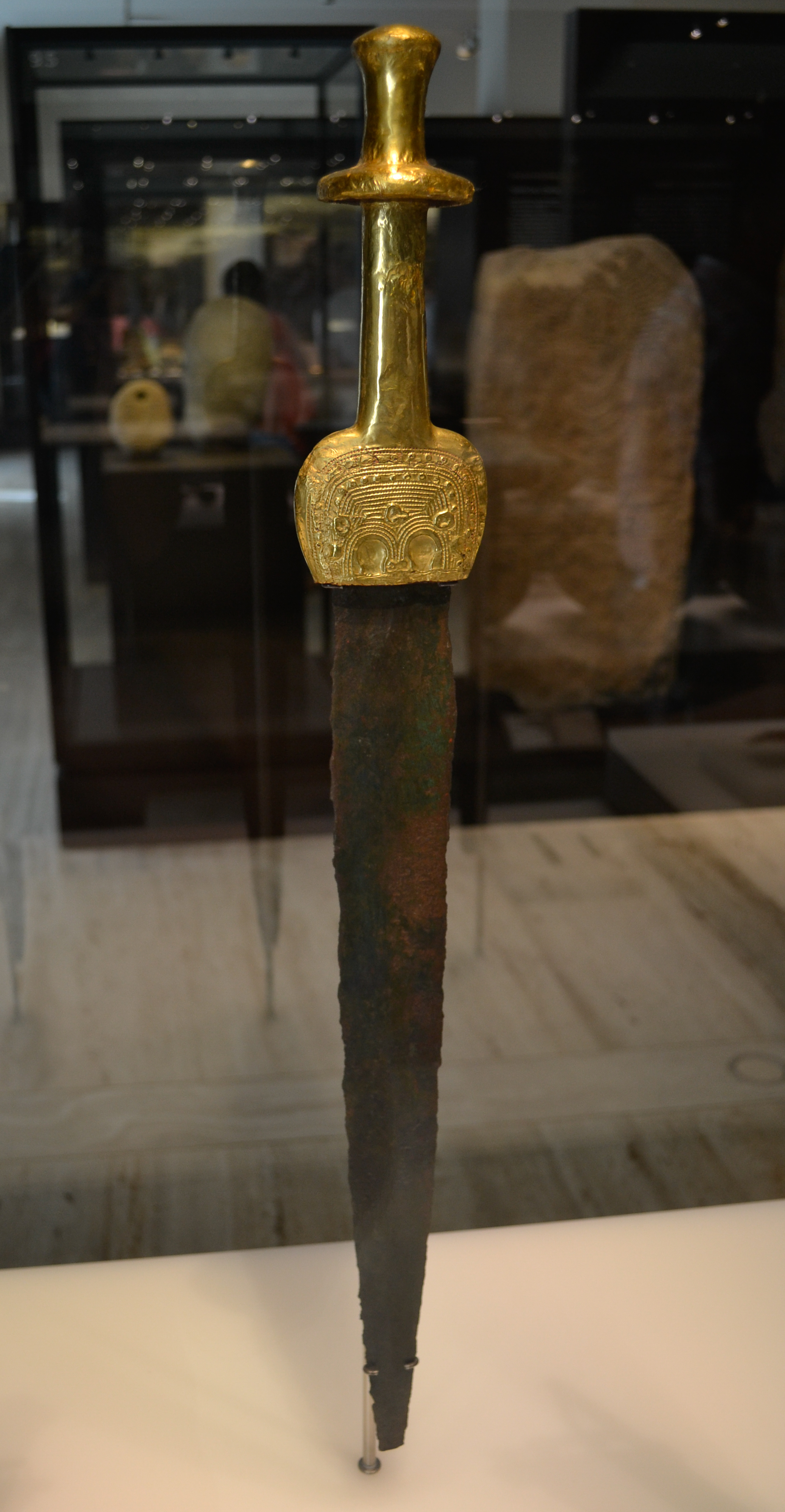
The Sword of Guadalajara, c. 1600 BC

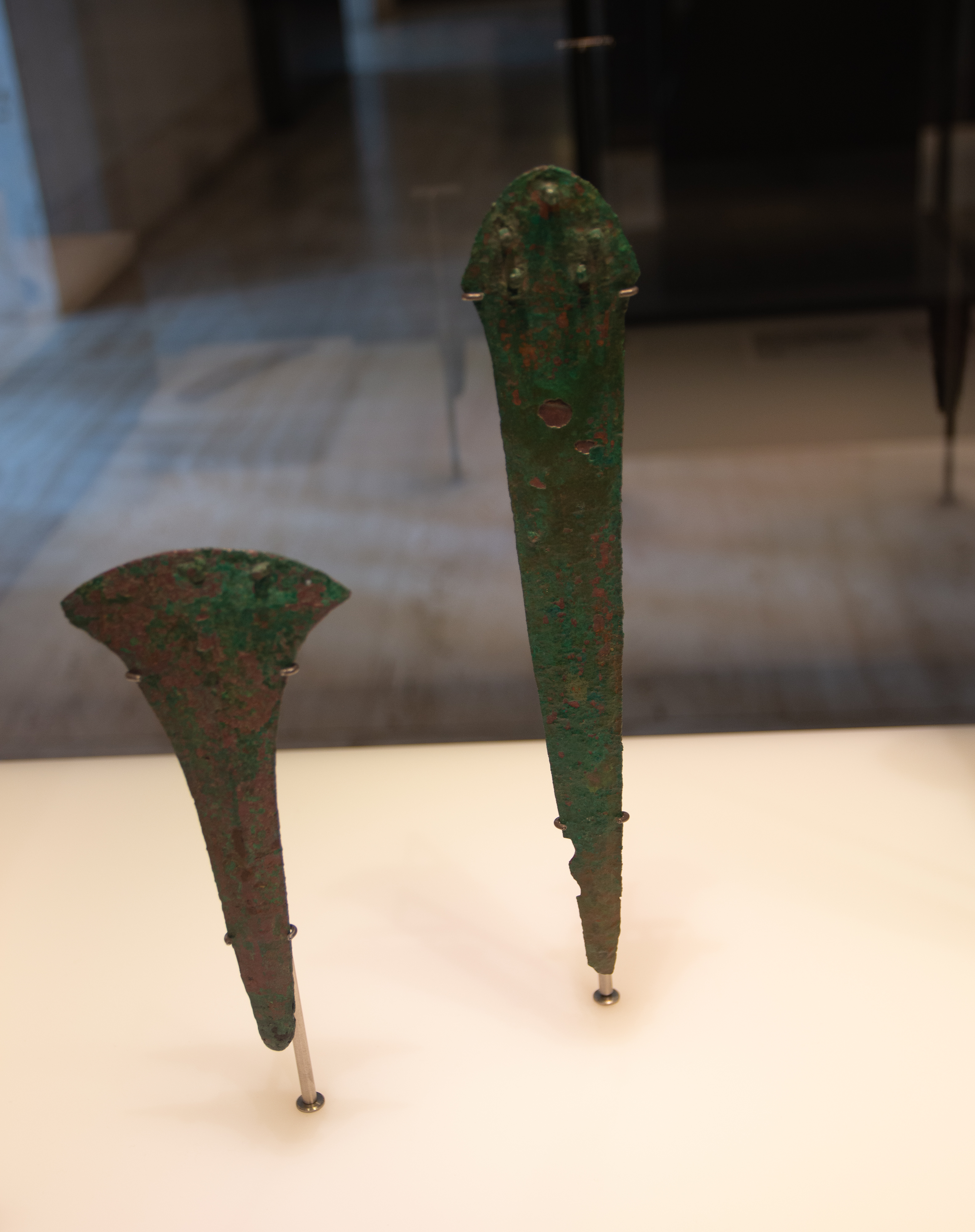
Bronze axe and dagger blade

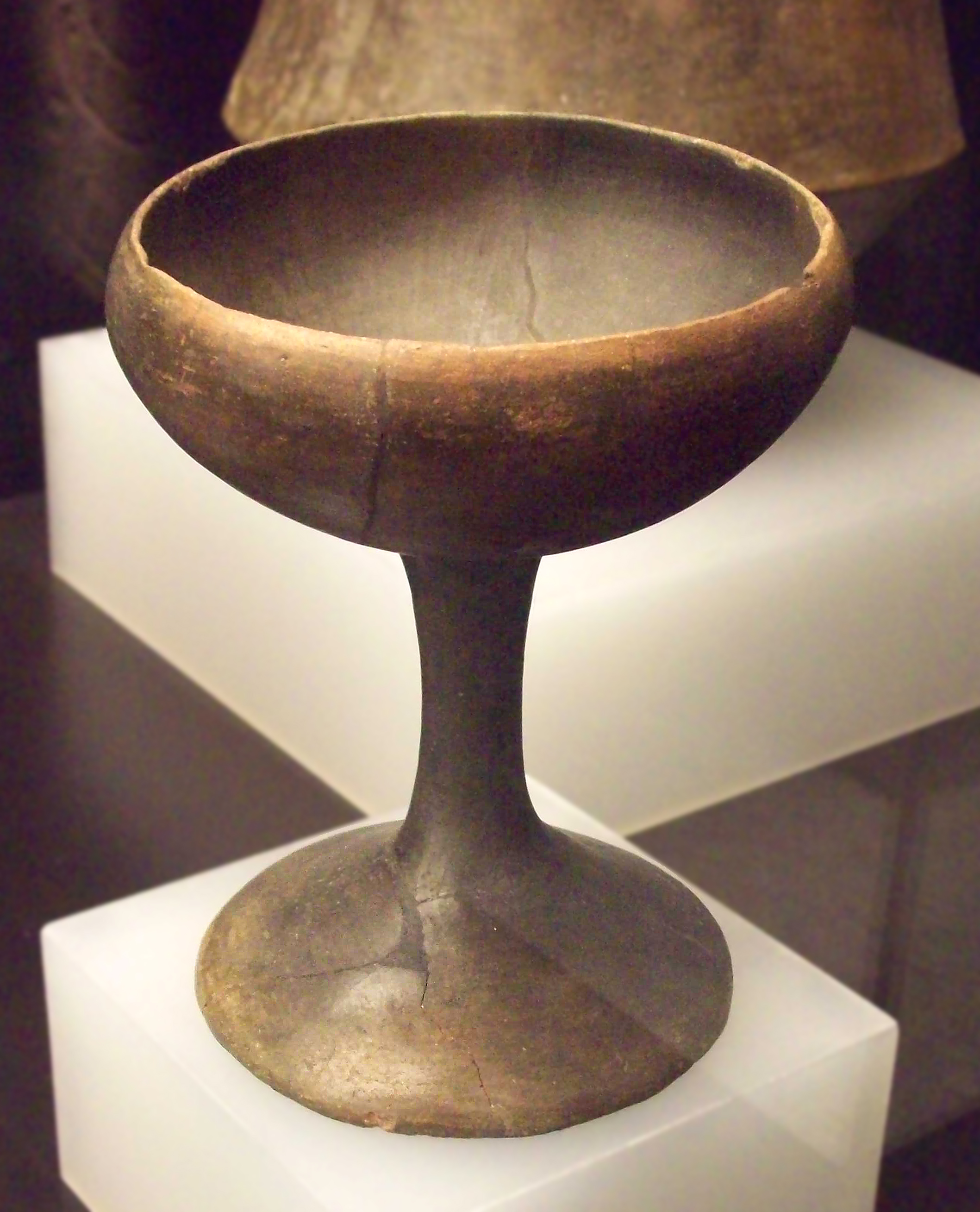
Ceramic cup

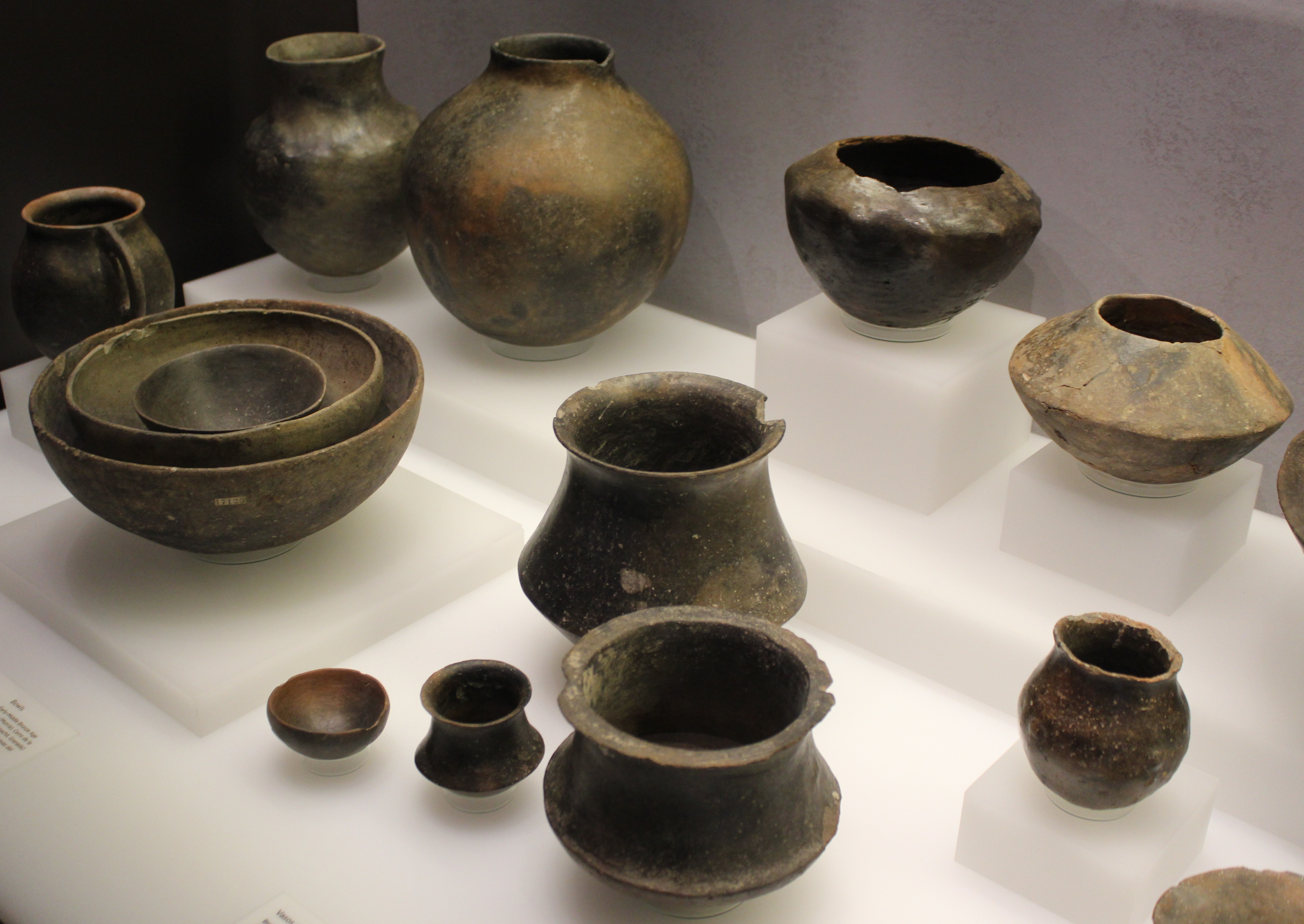
Pottery

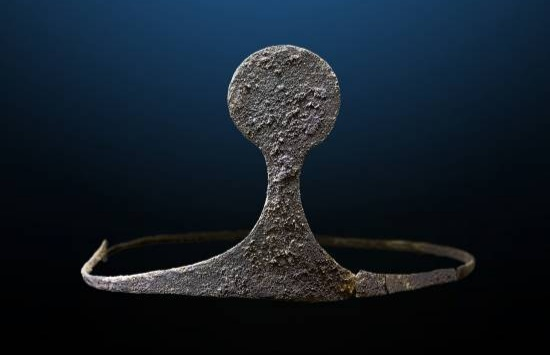
Silver diadem from La Almoloya, c. 1650 BC

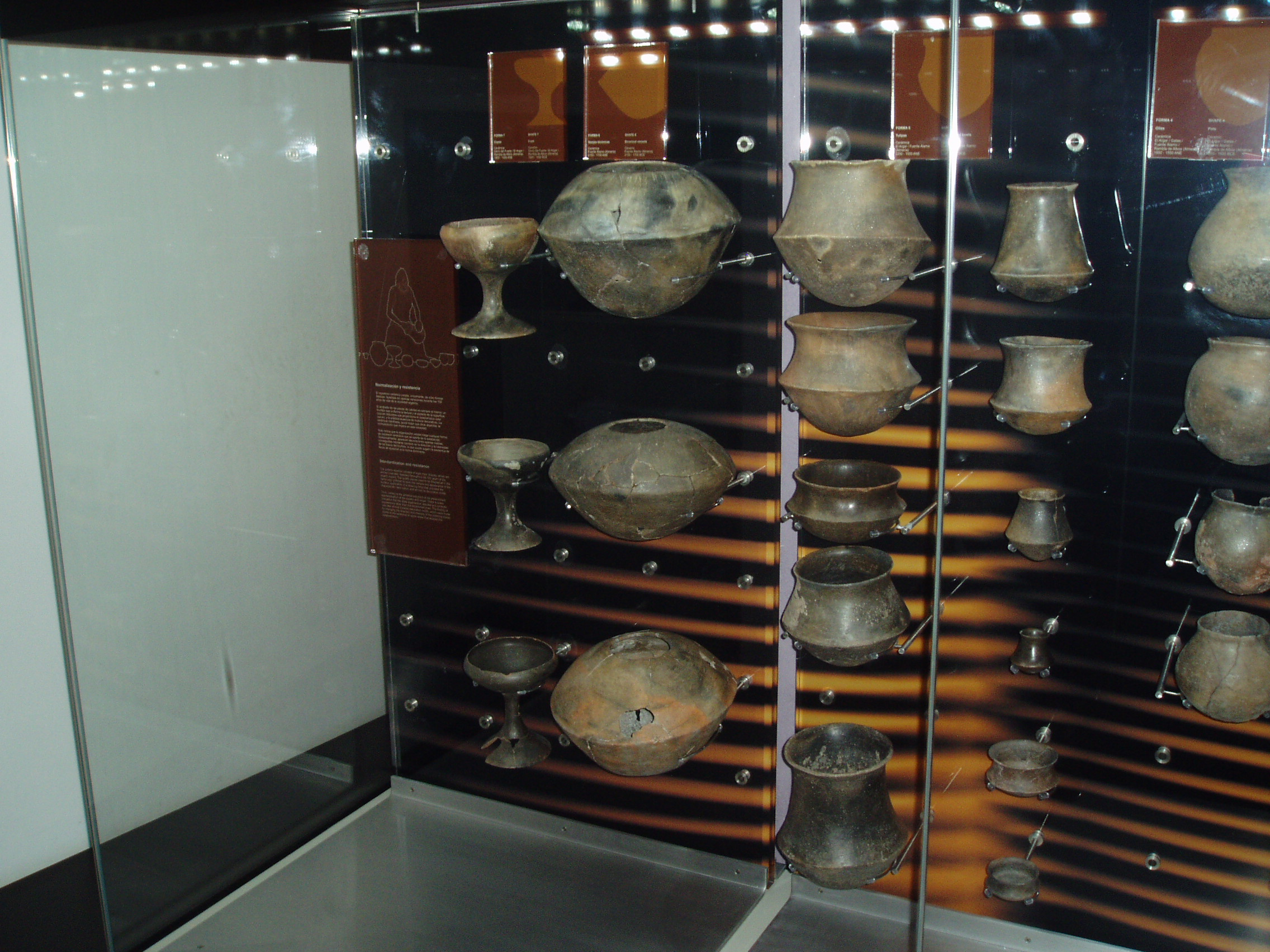
Pottery

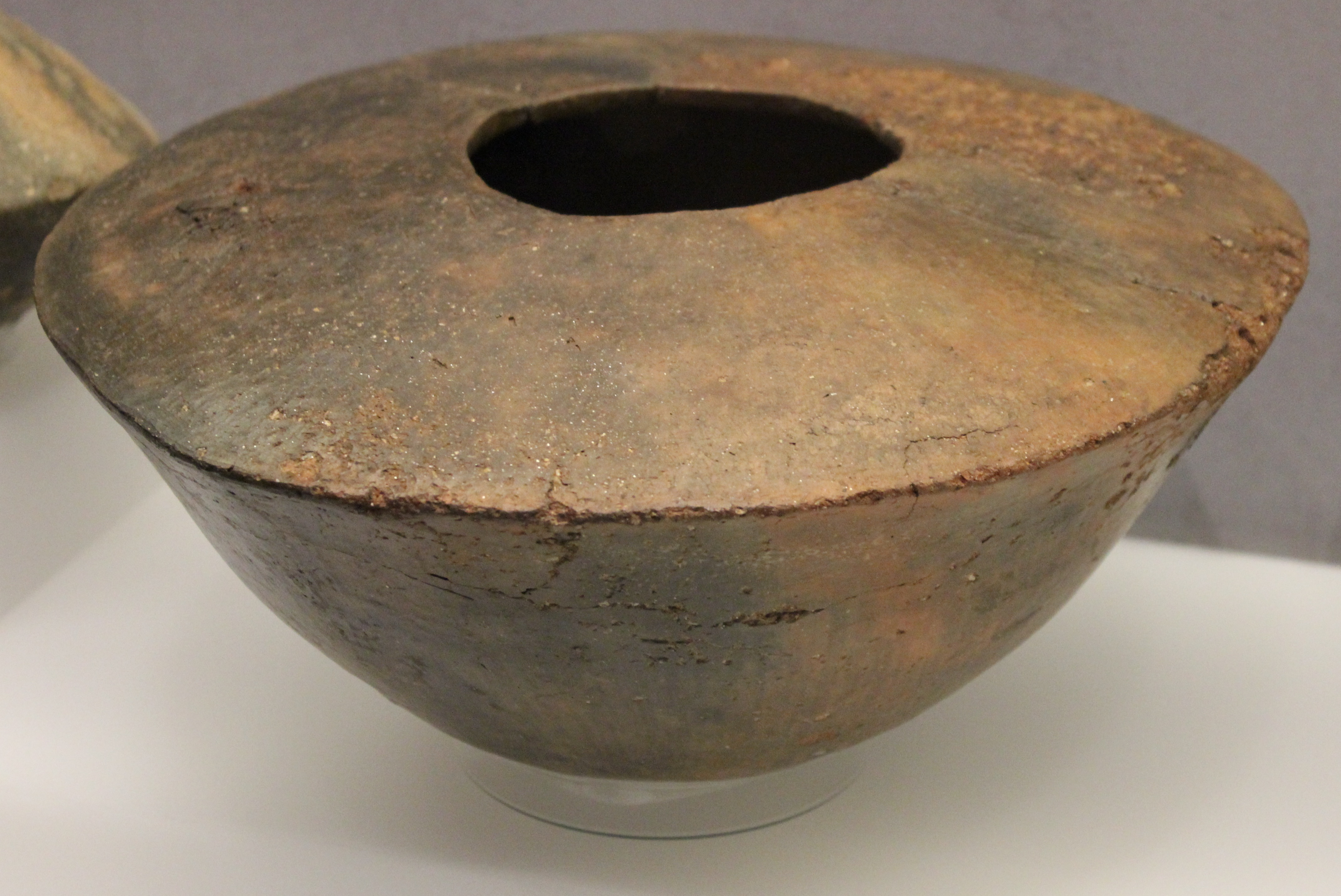
Pottery

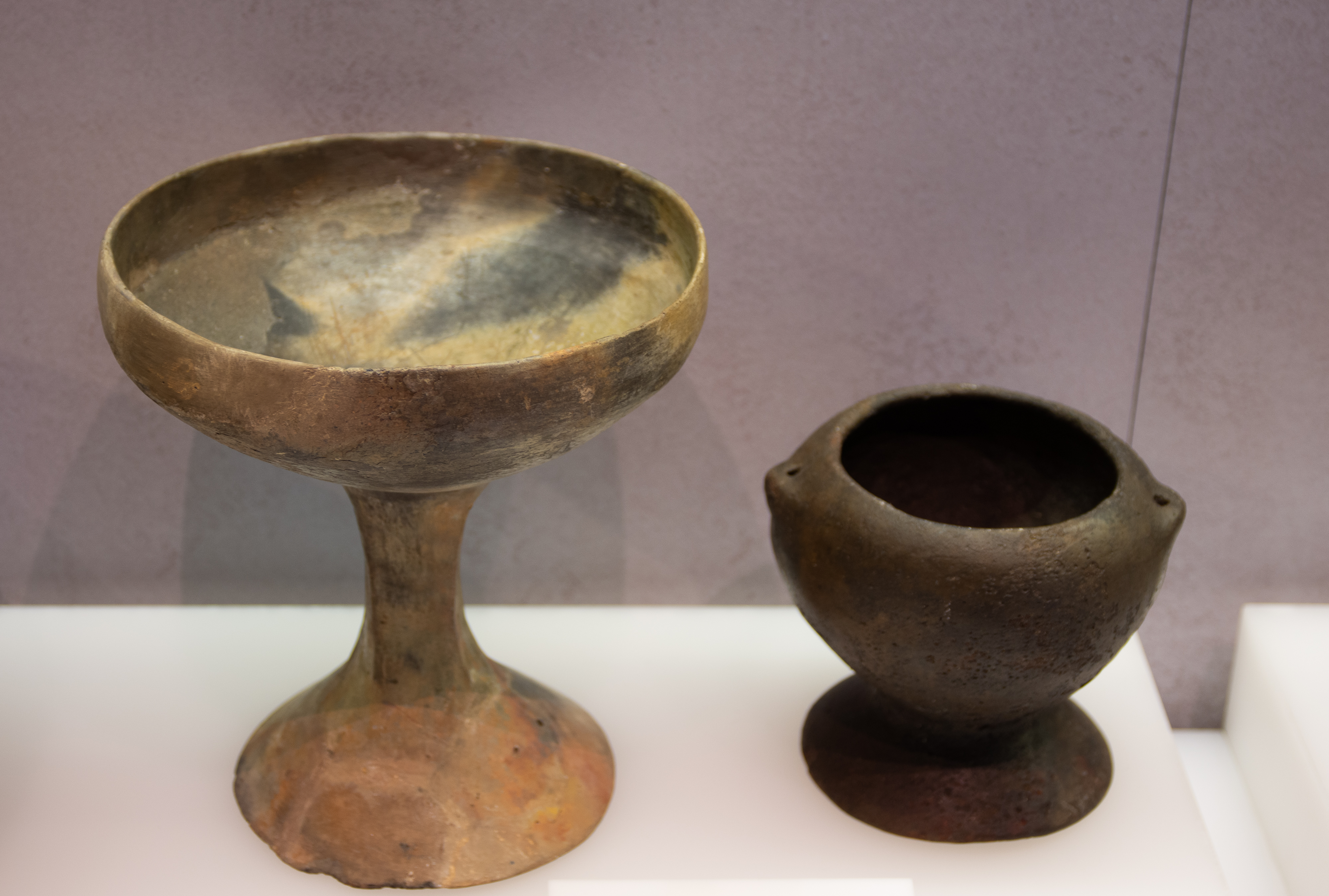
Ceramics

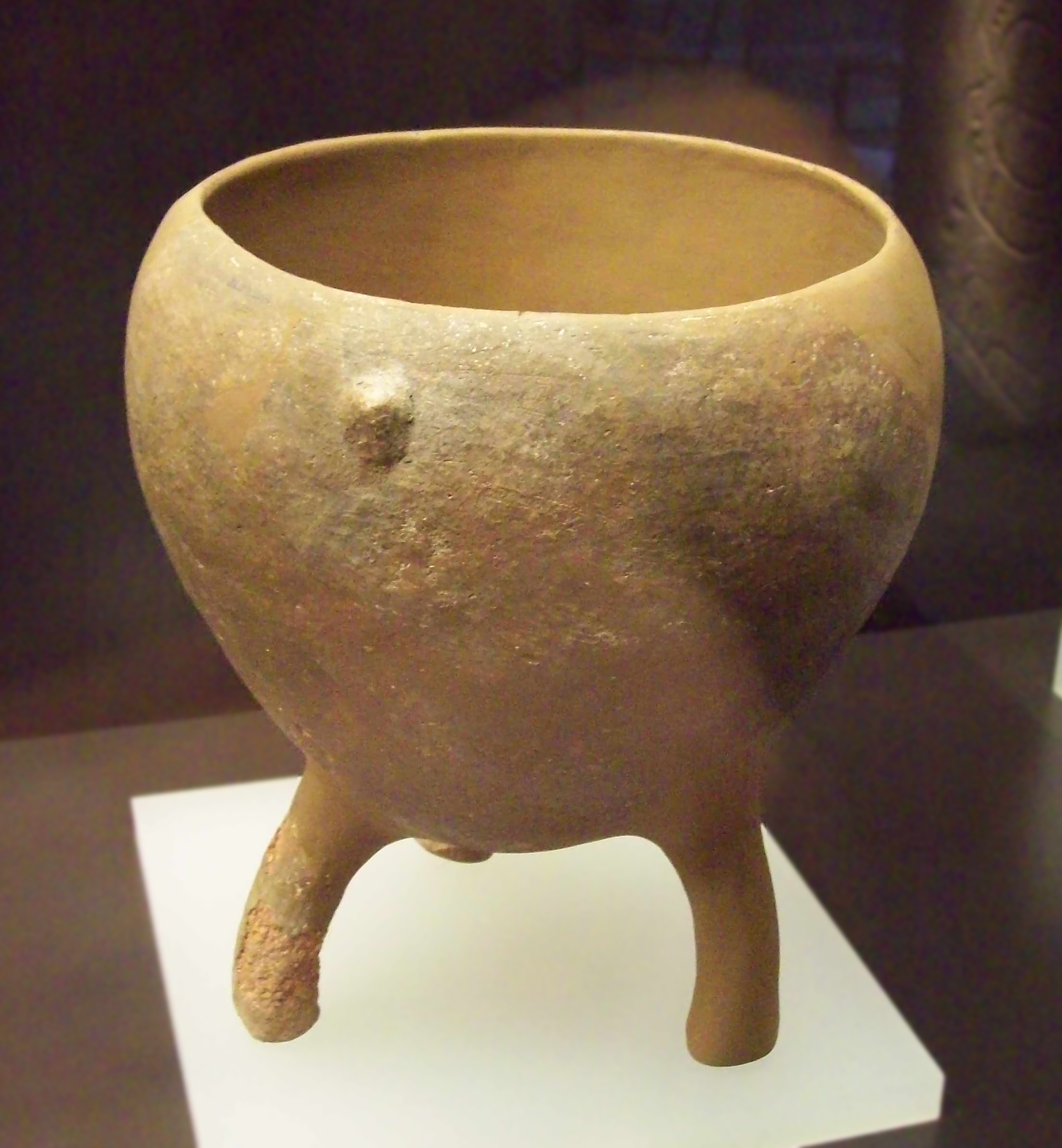
Ceramics

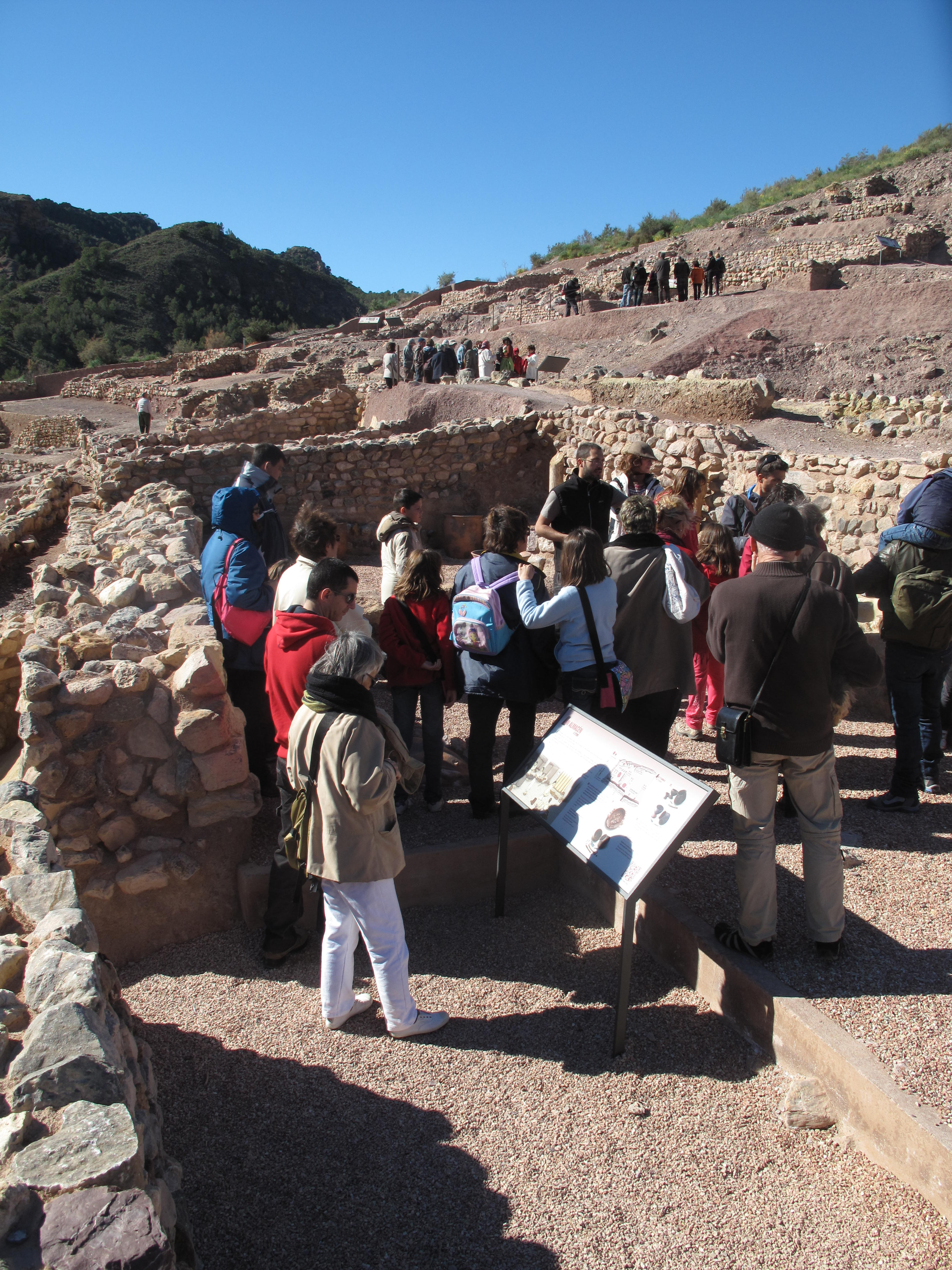
La Bastida Totana archaeological site

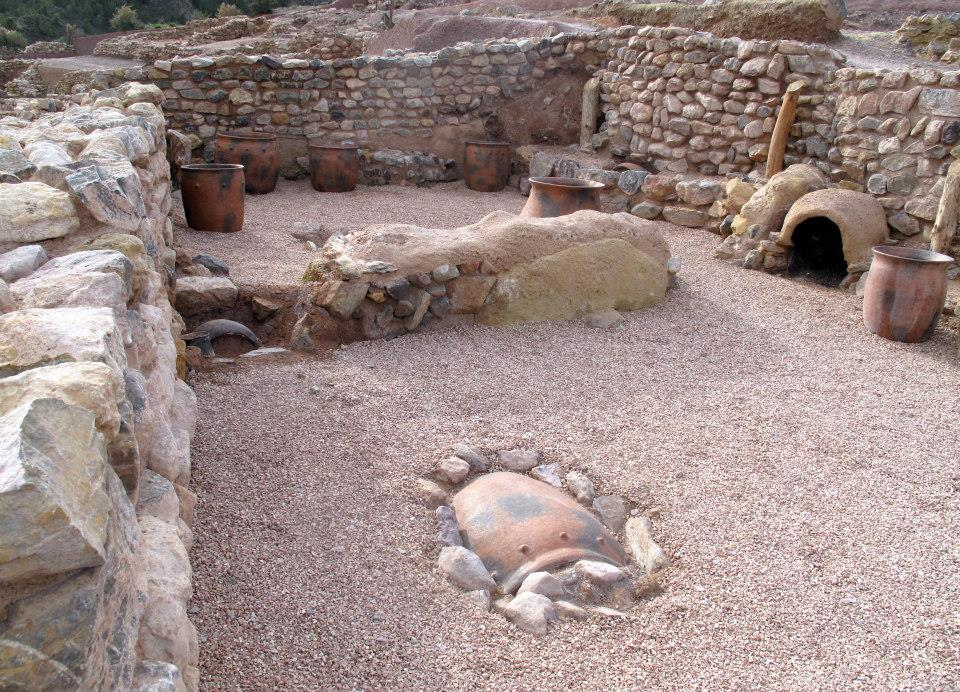
Remains of a house at La Bastida Totana

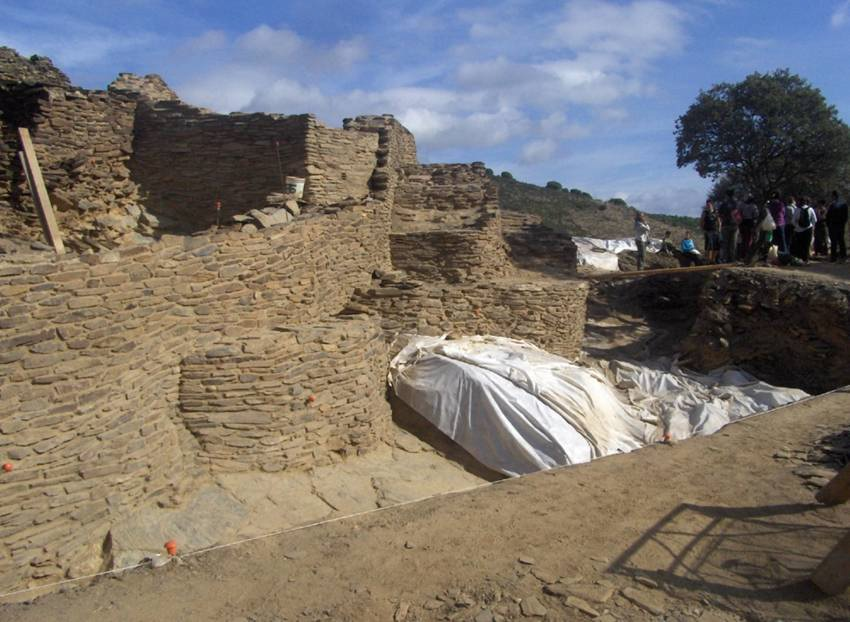
Excavation at Peñalosa

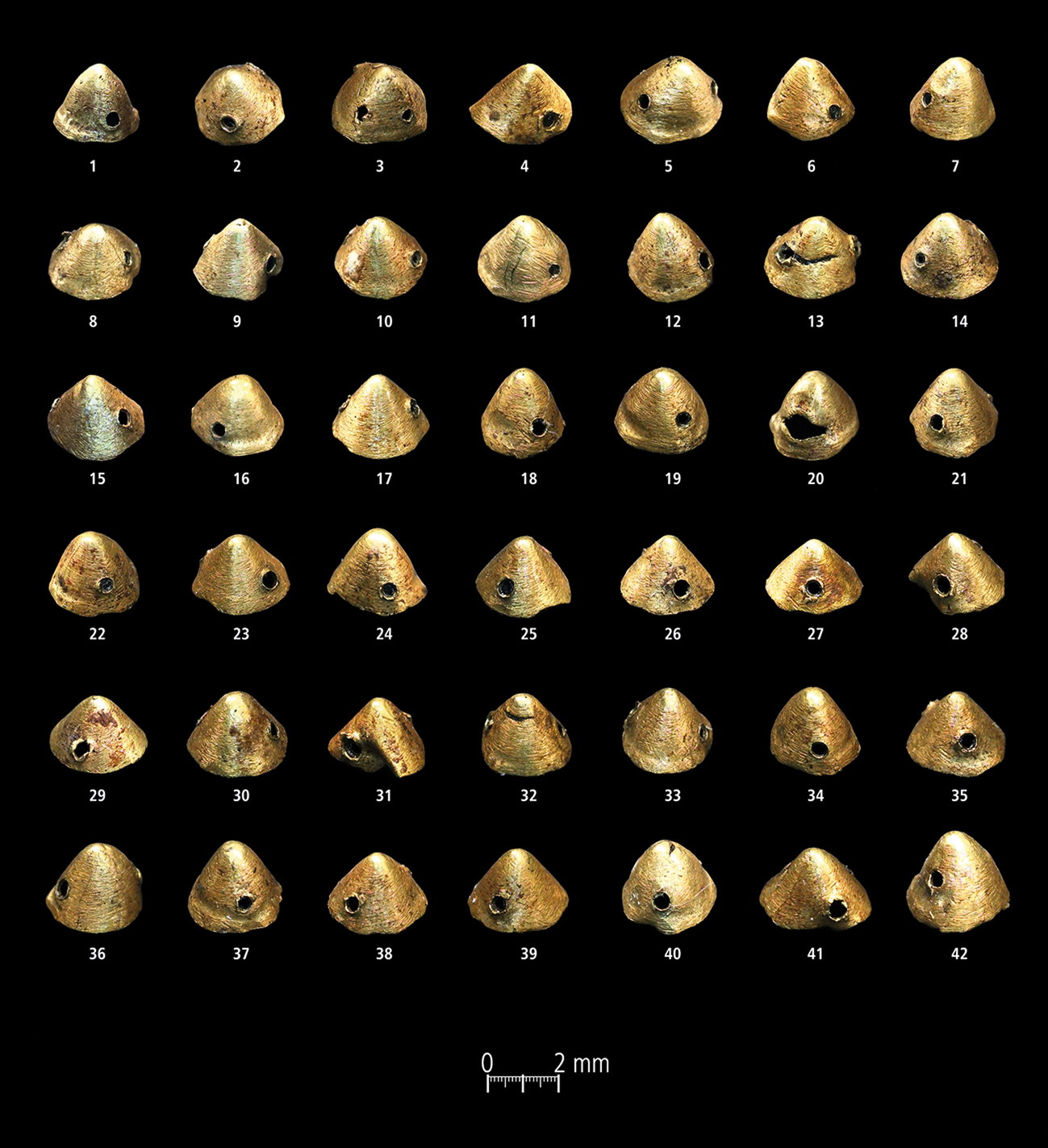
Decorative gold cones from San Antón

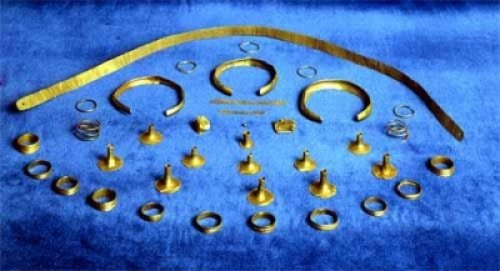
Treasure of Cabezo Redondo

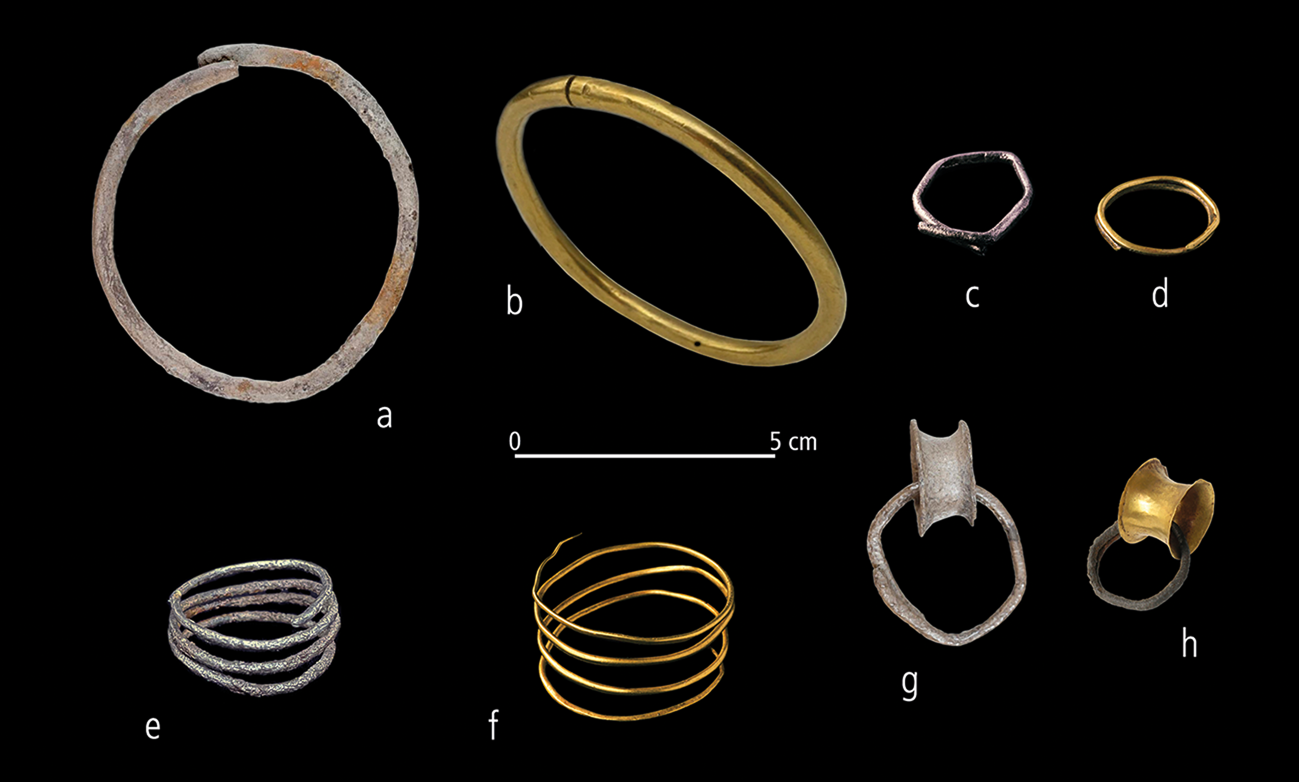
Silver and gold jewellery

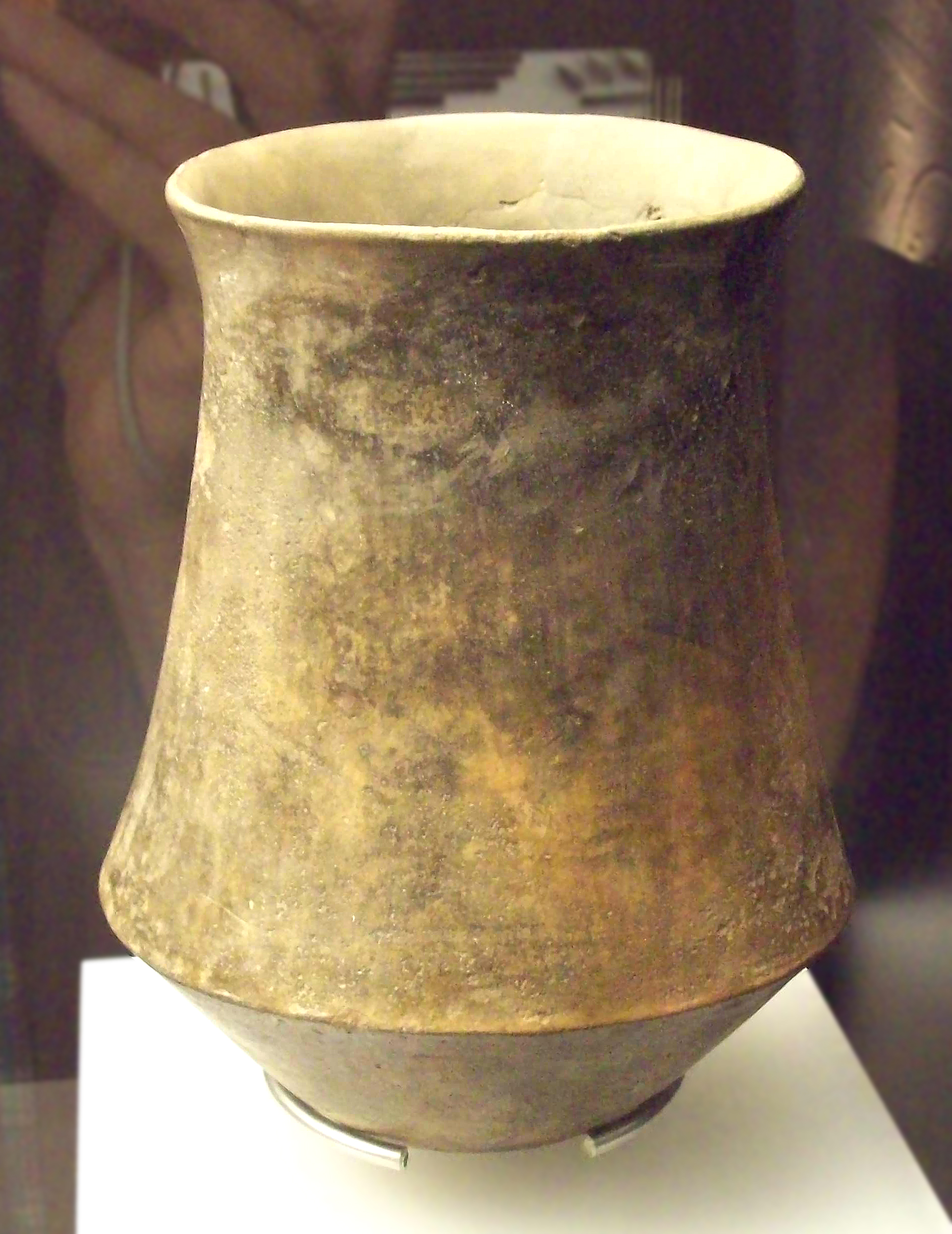
Pottery

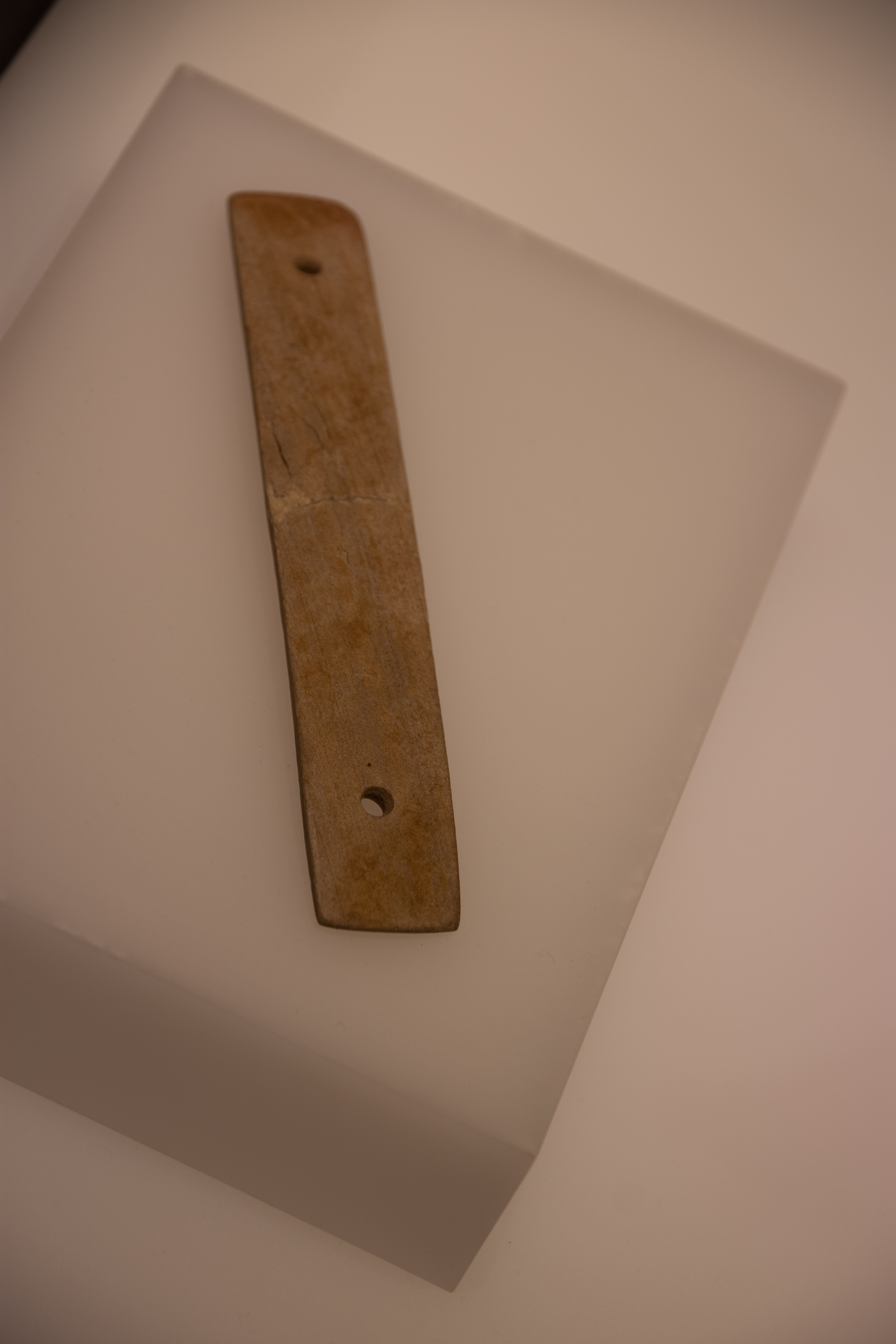
Archer's wristguard

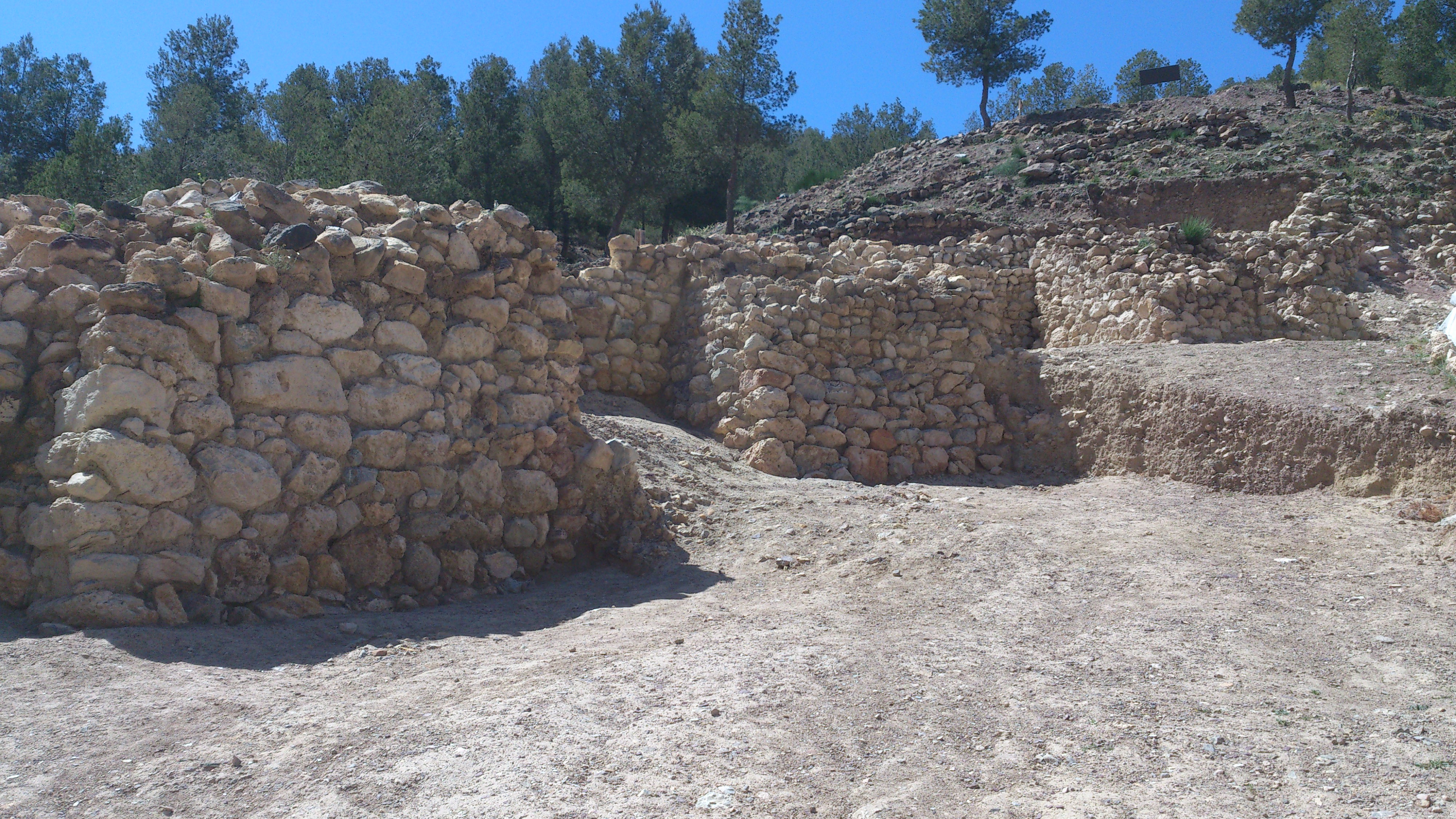
La Bastida de Totana wall remains

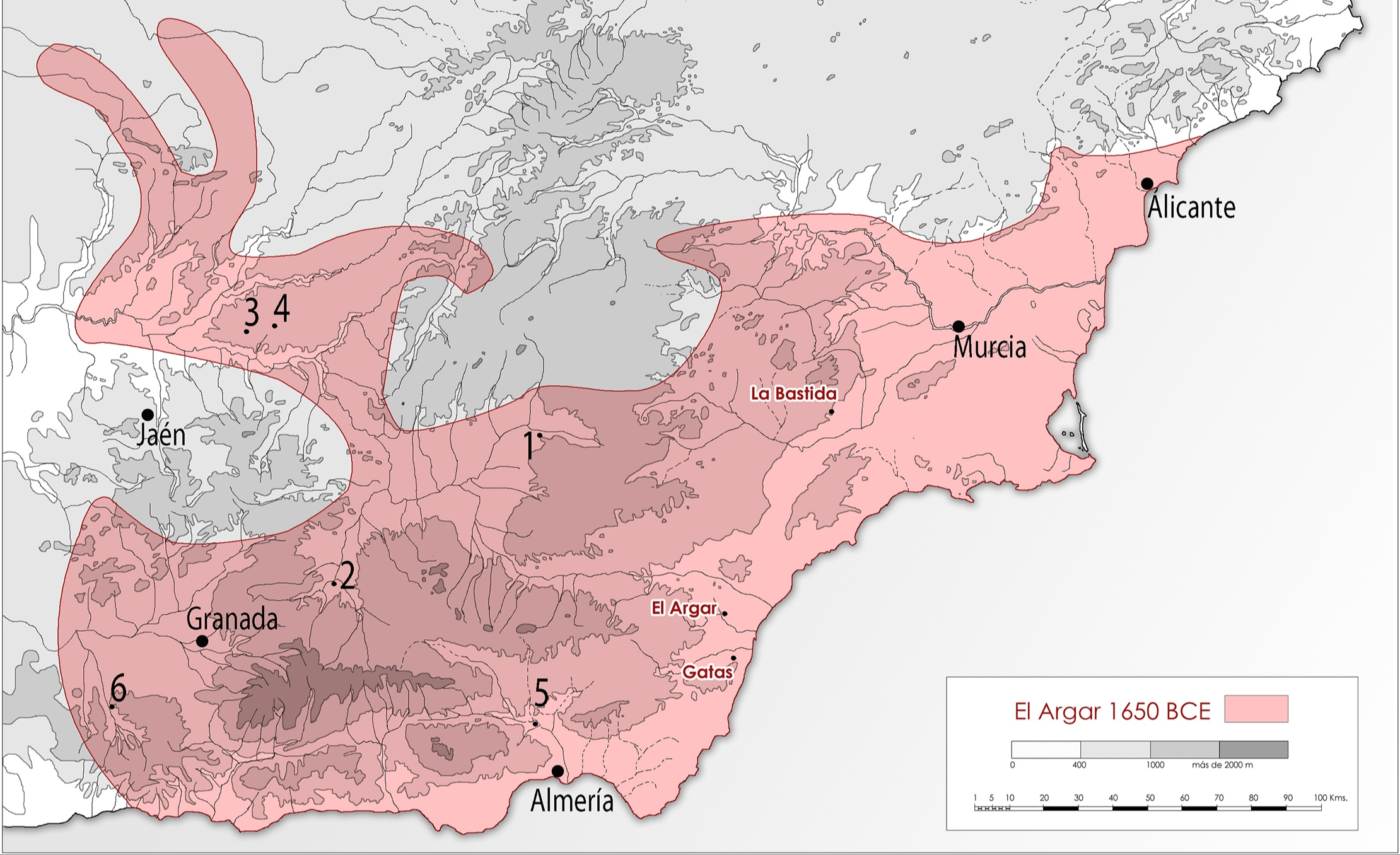
Map of El Argar

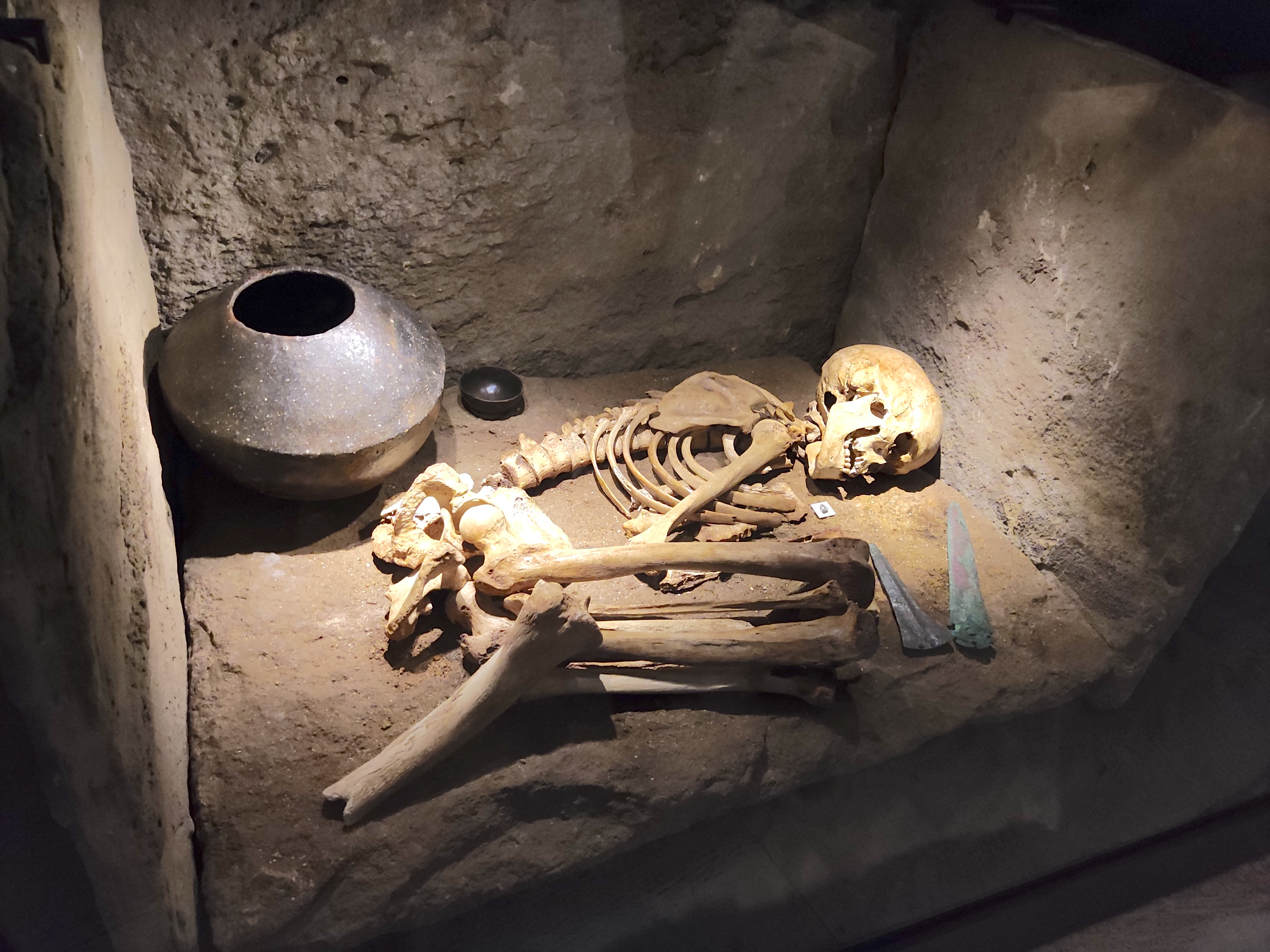
Cist burial reconstruction

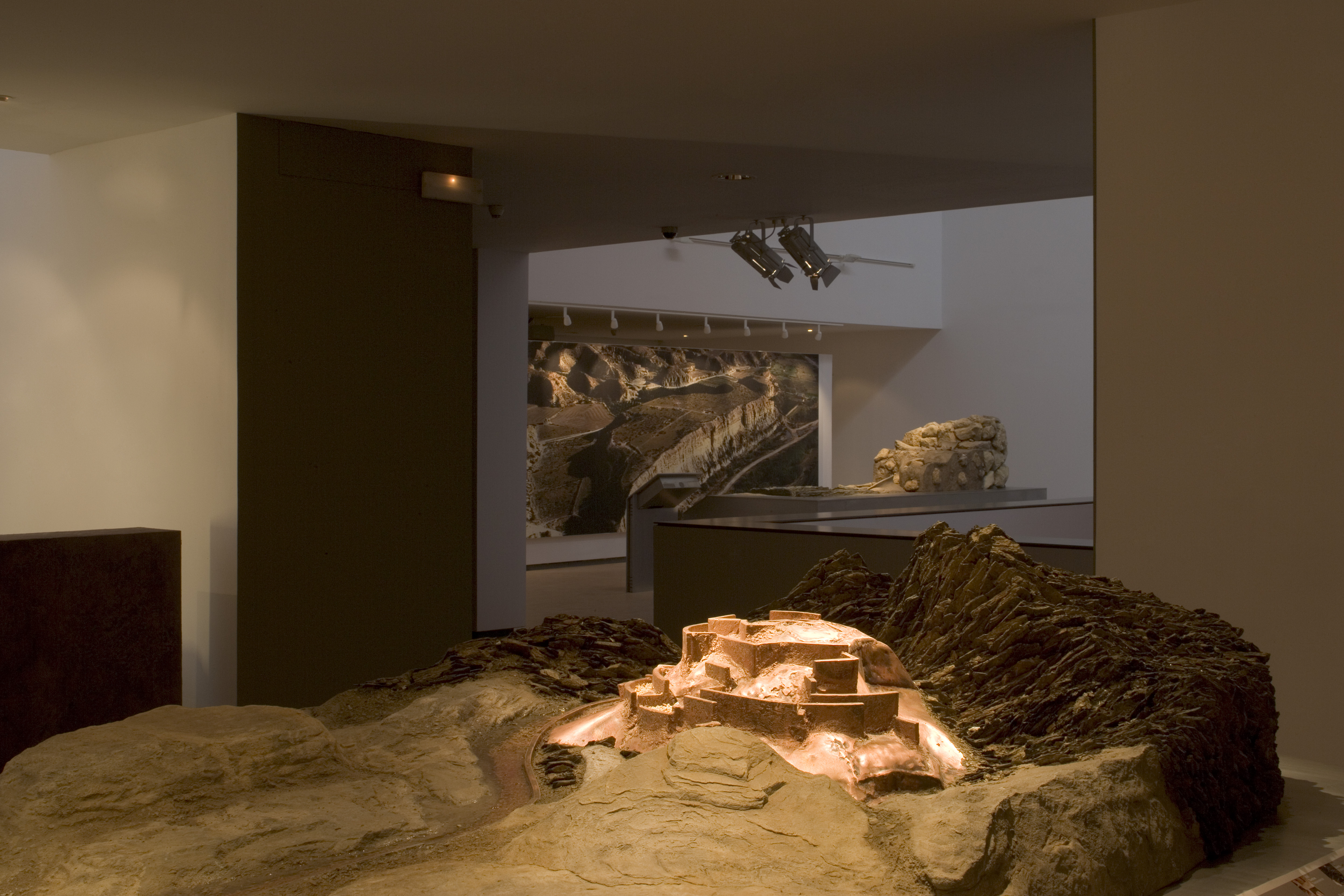
El Argar

== Related cultures ==
- Los Millares: its antecessor culture.
- Bell Beaker culture: its antecessor culture.
- Bronze of Levante: extending by the Land of Valencia: with smaller towns but very related to El Argar.
- Motillas (La Mancha): what would seem a military march of these proto-Iberian peoples.
- Cogotas culture was influenced by El Argar.
- South-Western Iberian Bronze circle.
- Mycenaean Greece: some cultural exchanges across the Mediterranean are very clear, with Argarians adopting Greek funerary customs (individual burials, first in cist and then in pithos), while Greeks also import the Iberian tholos for the same purpose.
- Nuragic civilization: Cultural exchange and probably influenced the Nuragic people with their tholos.

== See also ==
- Vila Nova de Sao Pedro
- Prehistoric Iberia
- Treasure of Villena
- Unetice culture
- Bronze Age Britain
- Ottomány culture
- Bell Beaker culture
- Levantine bronze

== Bibliography ==
- F. Jordá Cerdá et al. History of Spain 1: Prehistory. Gredos ed. 1986. ISBN 84-249-1015-X
