= La Almoloya =

Archaeological site in Spain

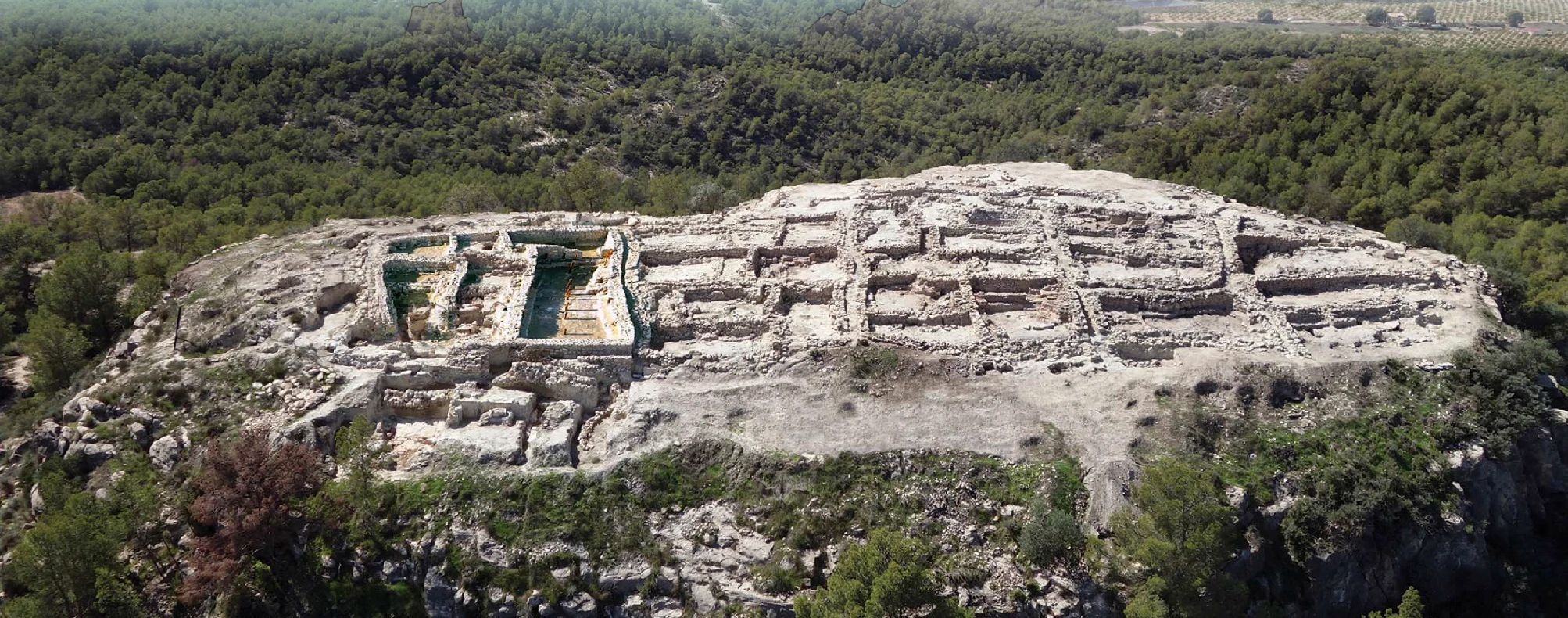
- La Almoloya

- Location in Spain
- 37°57′09.8″N 1°30′29.0″W
- Type: Bronze Age Argaric culture settlement
- Location: Murcia, Spain
- Region: Iberian Peninsula

La Almoloya is an archaeological site in Murcia, the southeast corner of the Iberian Peninsula in modern-day Spain. It is a principal site of study for the Bronze Age Argaric culture that flourished from about 2200 BC to 1500 BC and controlled territory in Iberia that is equivalent in size to modern Belgium.

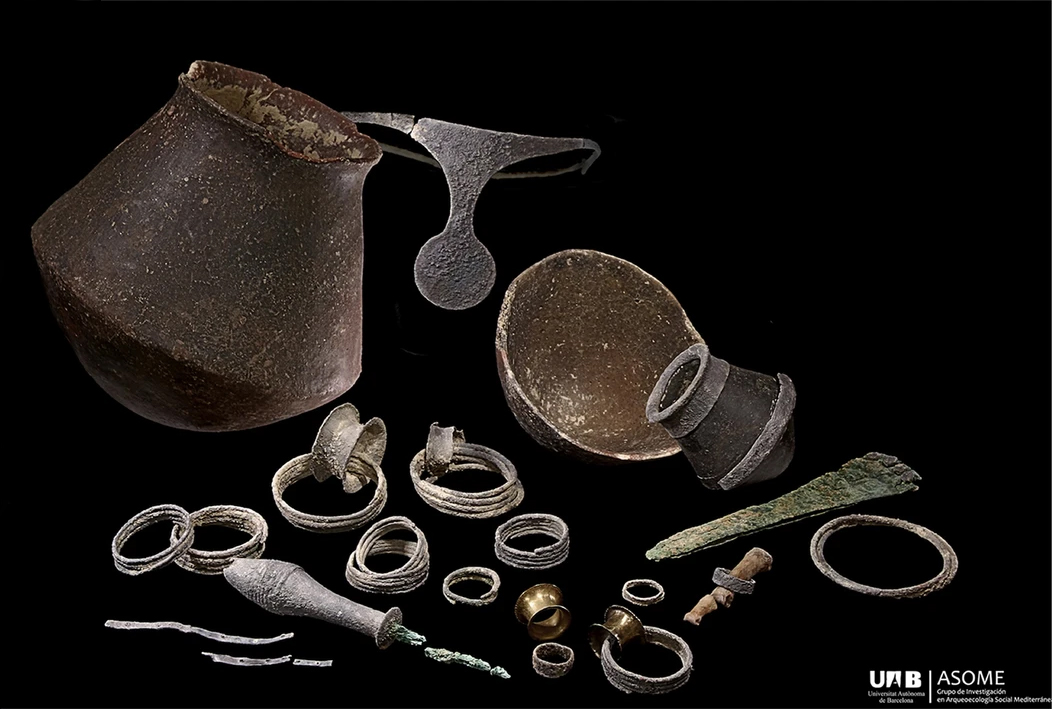
Grave goods from La Almoloya burial AY38, including a silver diadem and gold bracelets

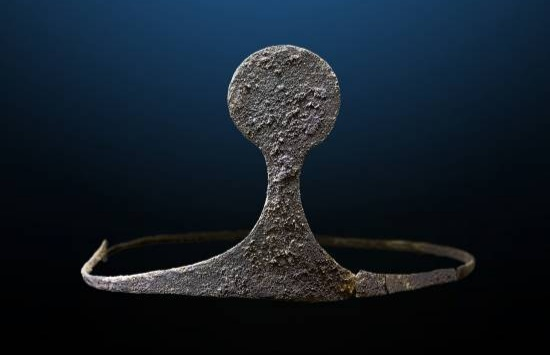
Silver diadem from La Almoloya

.

The site includes the find of what is described as an "especially rich" grave 38, which was excavated beginning in 2014. It contains the skeletal remains of a woman and a man. The vast majority of the grave goods are associated with the woman; it contains numerous silver grave goods, including a diadem. The couple is buried beneath the floor of a large building. Radiocarbon dating suggests the burial took place at approximately 1700 BC. Remains of a female infant who was a first-degree descendant of the couple was found in a separate grave at the site.

The silver treasure associated with the woman in grave 38 has been valued at tens of thousands of dollars. The graves of other high-ranking Argaric women discovered at the site also contained silver treasure, suggesting they may have had powerful political status in the society.

According to Lull et al., the building above the grave may be one of the earliest Bronze Age palaces identified in Western Europe. It has been described as a large hall, with benches built into the sides, a podium in front of a hearth for heat and lighting, and seating for 50 people. Unique among the hundreds of buildings excavated in the study of El Argar culture, the hall appears to have been a place for the conduct of politics.
