= Fort of Archeira =

19th-century fort in Portugal

- Forte da Archeira
- Lisbon District, Near Torres Vedras in Portugal
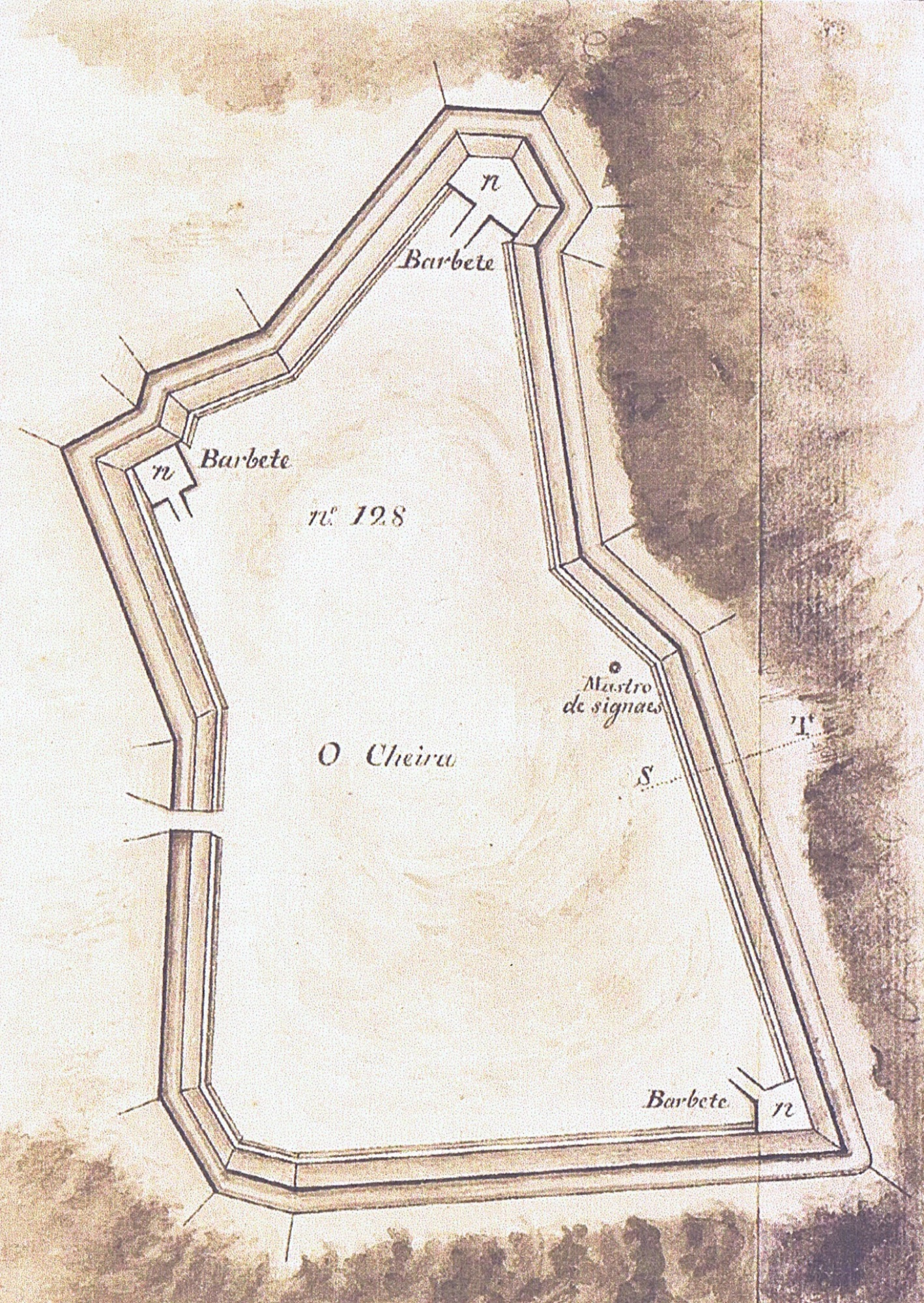

Site information
- Type: Fort
- Open to the public: Yes.
- Condition: Partly restored.

Location
- Coordinates: 39°02′04″N 9°13′06″W

Site history
- Built: 1810
- Built by: Duke of Wellington
- Materials: local stone
- Battles/wars: Unused in battle

Garrison information
- Garrison: 500

The Fort of Archeira is located in the municipality of Torres Vedras, in the Lisbon District of Portugal. It is also today known as the Furadouro Redoubt and was called the “Cheira” at the time of construction. Construction began in 1810 as part of the first of the three Lines of Torres Vedras, which were defensive lines to protect the Portuguese capital Lisbon from invasion by the French during the Peninsular War (1807–14) or, in the event of defeat, to protect the embarkation of a retreating British Army.

== Background ==
Despite the defeat of French forces in earlier invasions of Portugal during the Peninsular War, the threat of further invasions led the commander of the British troops in Portugal, Arthur Wellesley, 1st Duke of Wellington, to order on October 20, 1809 the construction of three defensive lines to the north of the capital, between the Atlantic Ocean and the River Tagus. The Lines of Torres Vedras, consisting of 152 forts, redoubts and other military works, were built rapidly and in great secrecy, under the overall supervision of Colonel Richard Fletcher who was commander of the Royal Engineers. The Anglo-Portuguese Army was forced to retreat to the first, most northerly, Line after winning the Battle of Buçaco (27 September 1810). The French army arrived at the Line on 11 October, taking the village of Sobral de Monte Agraço the following day. On 14 October the French tried to push forward but at the Battle of Sobral they were repelled by fire from forts on the first Line. After attempting to wait out the enemy, the lack of food and fodder in the area north of the Lines forced the French to retreat northwards, starting on the night of 14/15 November 1810. They never returned but work on some of the unfinished forts, including the Fort of Archeira, continued in subsequent years.

== The fort ==
The Fort of Archeira was designated Military Work No. 128 of the 152 separate works carried out on the Lines. It was on the first of the three Lines of Torres Vedras, to the southeast of the town of Torres Vedras and northeast of Monte Agraço, where the French were repelled. Designed for a garrison of 500 soldiers, Archeira had six 12-calibre guns. Like all of the forts it was surrounded by a ditch, or dry moat. Built at an altitude of 345 metres and following an irregular polygonal plan, it was the largest fortification of the Serra da Caduceira and was designed for a garrison of 500 soldiers. This stronghold, together with the Feiteira (No. 129) and Fort of Catefica (No. 130), both to the north, defended the vulnerable Runa and Ribaldeira river valleys, under the command of Baron Christian Adolph Friedrich von Eben and General Brent Spencer, who was on two occasions Wellington's second-in-command.

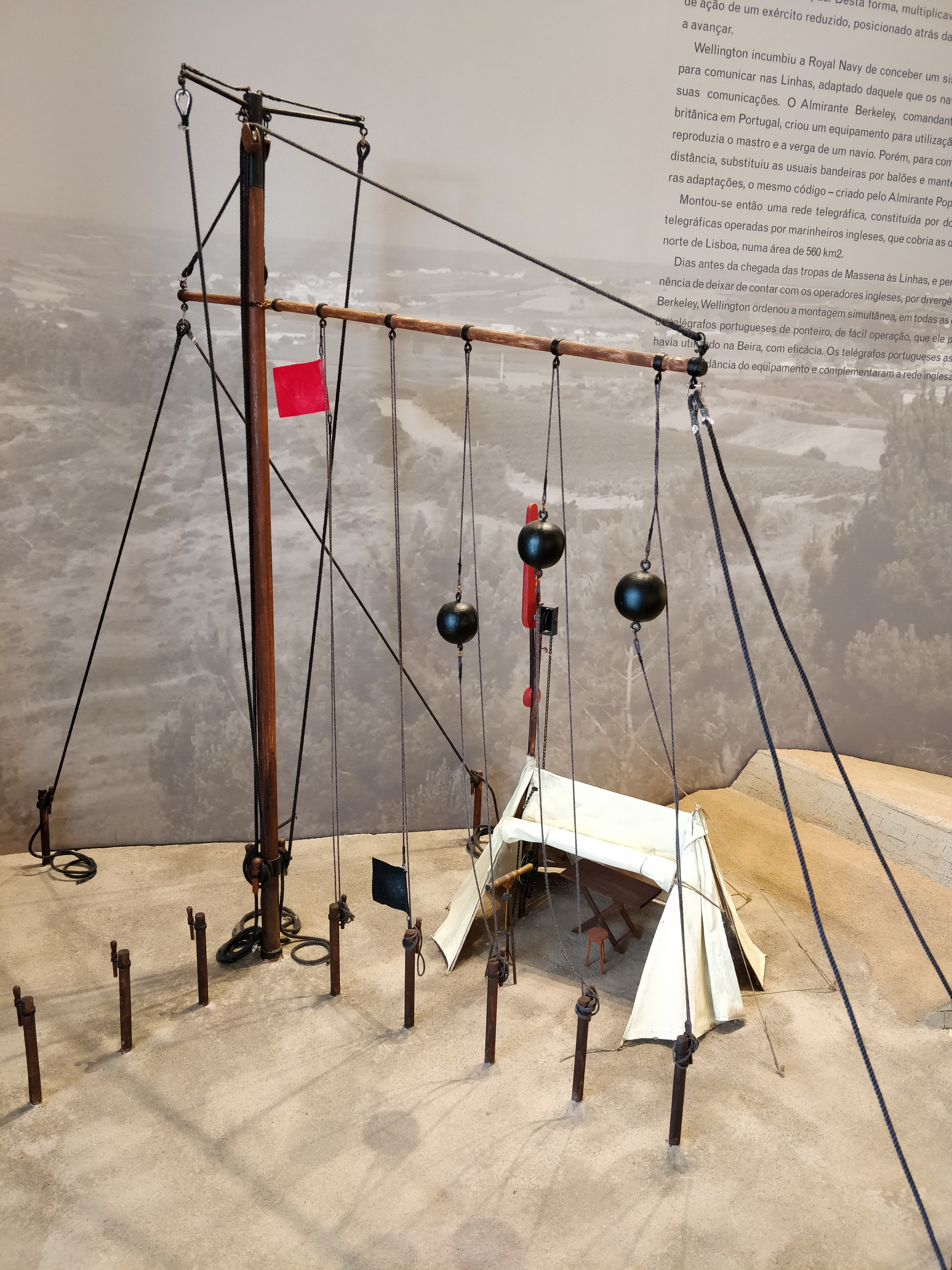
A model of the communications system

The fort was one of the Lines of Torres Vedras signal stations. Using an optical telegraph signalling system, it could communicate with the Fort of Alqueidão to the southeast and to both the Fort of São Vicente to the north of Torres Vedras and the Atlantic coast.

== Restoration ==
The fort underwent some limited restoration at the time of the 200th anniversary celebrations for the Lines of Torres Vedras but little of the original structure remains visible. The entrance to a small store room can be seen.

== See also ==
- List of forts of the Lines of Torres Vedras
- Leonel Trindade Municipal Museum in Torres Vedras, which has an exhibition on the Lines of Torres Vedras.
