= Pero Negro =

Wellington's headquarters in Portugal

Coordinates: 38°59′21″N 9°12′04″W

Pero Negro is a village in the parish of Sapataria in the municipality of Sobral de Monte Agraço in the Lisbon district of Portugal. The village is most notable as having been the headquarters of Arthur Wellesley, later the Duke of Wellington, who commanded the allied forces during the third French invasion of Portugal during the Peninsular War (1807-14), which was part of the Napoleonic Wars.

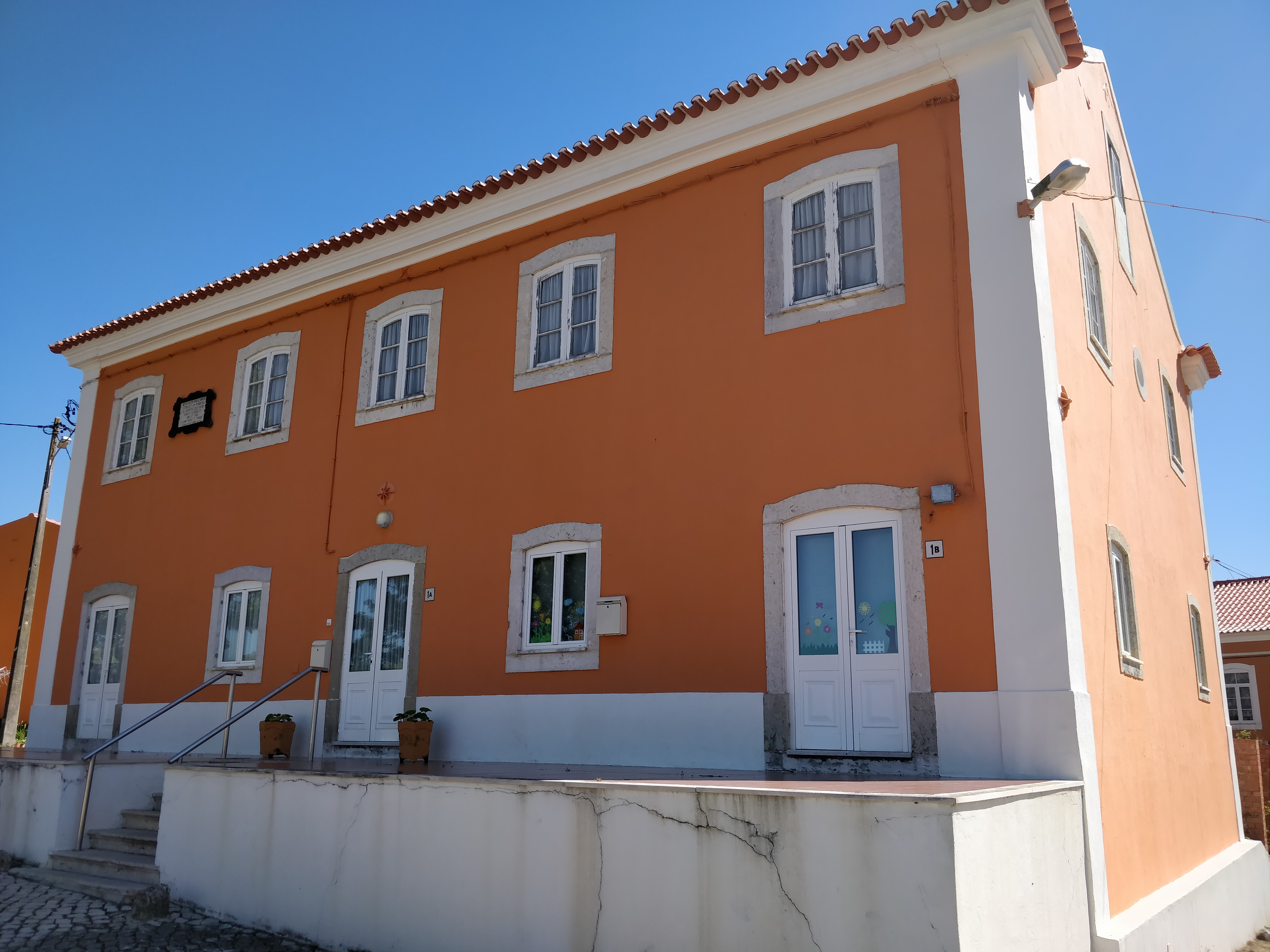
Arthur Wellesley's headquarters at Pero Negro

== Basic Information ==
In the 2011 Portuguese census Pero Negro had a population of 609 people, with a population density of 724 people per km2. Its altitude is approximately 150 metres. It has a railway station on the Oeste line.

== Wellington's headquarters ==
After the Battle of Talavera in Spain in July 1809, Wellington realised that he was outnumbered by the French. This meant that he could be forced to retreat to Portugal and possibly evacuate his troops. He was under strict instructions from London to minimise losses, as other British army resources were limited. Feeling that he could not defeat the French in open battle, in October 1809 Wellesley ordered the construction of the Lines of Torres Vedras, four lines of forts, redoubts and other defences between the River Tagus and the Atlantic Ocean, which, taking advantage of the natural contours, were designed both to defend the Portuguese capital of Lisbon, and provide protection for a possible evacuation by the British. In October 1810 these defensive lines proved successful in resisting the French troops under Marshal Masséna, who retreated in March 1811.

Wellington established his headquarters in Pero Negro on a property known as Quinta dos Freixos, belonging to the Baron of Manique. It was situated about 4km to the west of the Fort of Alqueidão, known as the "Great Redoubt", at 440 metres above sea level on the Monte Agraço range. He would ride there every morning before dawn and on his arrival riders would be sent out to check that there had been no changes in the French positions overnight. The headquarters were also conveniently situated close to Monte Socorro, which was one of the five main signal stations for the British on the northernmost line of forts.

About one kilometre from Wellington's headquarters, in Casal Cochin, were the headquarters of William Beresford, 1st Viscount Beresford, commander of the Portuguese army. Also nearby were the headquarters of Pedro Caro Sureda, 3rd Marquis of La Romana, a Spanish army officer and nobleman and General Brent Spencer, commander of the 1st Division.
