= Fort of Feiteira =

19th-century fort in Portugal

- Forte da Feiteira
- Lisbon District, Near Torres Vedras in Portugal
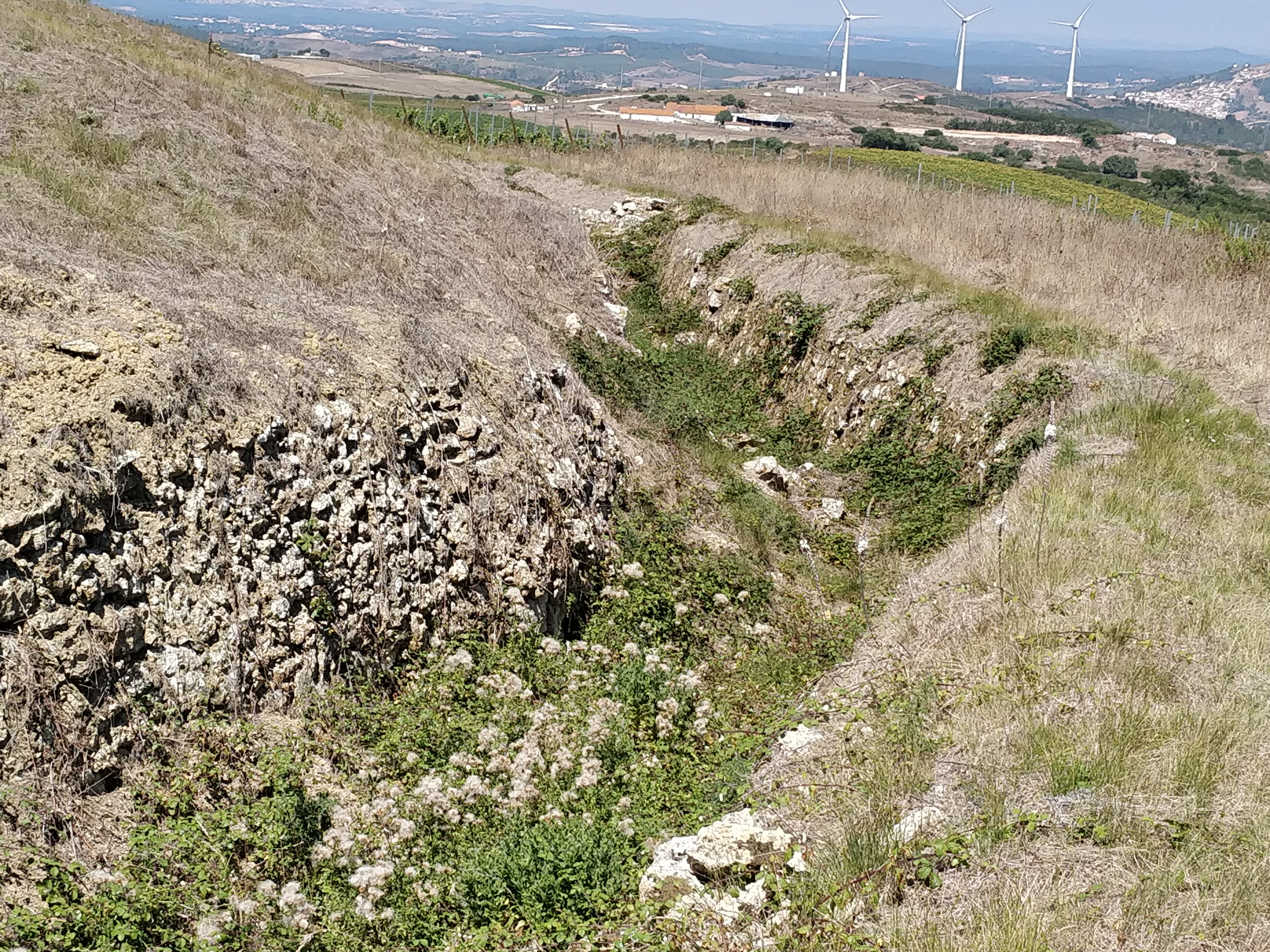

Site information
- Type: Fort
- Open to the public: Yes.
- Condition: Partly restored.

Location
- Coordinates: 39°02′40″N 9°13′55″W

Site history
- Built: 1810-
- Built by: Duke of Wellington
- Battles/wars: Unused in battle

Garrison information
- Garrison: 350

The Fort of Feiteira is located in the municipality of Torres Vedras, in the Lisbon District of Portugal. Construction of the fort began in 1810 as part of the first of the three Lines of Torres Vedras, which were defensive lines to protect the Portuguese capital Lisbon from invasion by the French during the Peninsular War (1807–14) or, in the event of defeat, to protect the embarkation of a retreating British Army.

== Background ==
Despite the defeat of French forces in earlier invasions of Portugal during the Peninsular War, the threat of further invasions led the commander of the British troops in Portugal, Arthur Wellesley, 1st Duke of Wellington, to order on October 20, 1809, the construction of three defensive lines to the north of the capital, between the Atlantic Ocean and the River Tagus. The Lines of Torres Vedras, consisting of 152 forts, redoubts and other military works, were built rapidly and in great secrecy, under the overall supervision of Colonel Richard Fletcher who was commander of the Royal Engineers. The Anglo-Portuguese Army was forced to retreat to the first, most northerly, line after winning the Battle of Buçaco (27 September 1810). The French army arrived at the lines on 11 October and took the village of Sobral de Monte Agraço the following day. On 14 October the French tried to push forward but at the Battle of Sobral they were repelled by fire from forts on the first line. After attempting to wait out the enemy, the lack of food and fodder in the area north of the lines forced the French to retreat northwards, starting on the night of 14/15 November 1810. They never returned but work on some of the unfinished forts, including the Fort of Feiteira, continued in subsequent years.

== The fort ==
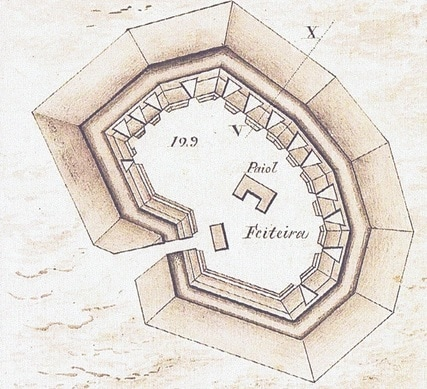
Drawing of the plan of the fort

The Fort of Feiteira was designated Military Work No. 129 of the 152 separate works carried out on the Lines. At 249 metres above sea level, it was on the first of the three Lines of Torres Vedras, to the southeast of the town of Torres Vedras and northeast of Monte Agraço, where the French were repelled. It was under the command of the German Baron of Eben and of General Brent Spencer, who was on two occasions Wellington's second-in-command. The fort was situated between two other forts, the Fort of Catefica to the north and the Fort of Archeira to the south. Combined, these three forts were designed to protect the Ribaldeira and Runa valleys. Feiteira had 13 gun emplacements and nine cannon. Like all of the forts it was surrounded by a ditch, or dry moat.

== Restoration ==
With resources from EEA and Norway Grants, the Fort of Feiteira was one of the military works of the Lines of Torres Vedras that was restored in 2010 to mark the 200th anniversary of the construction of the Lines. The fort can be easily visited, with access along a dirt road.

== See also ==
- List of forts of the Lines of Torres Vedras
- Leonel Trindade Municipal Museum in Torres Vedras, which has an exhibition on the Lines of Torres Vedras.
