= Fort of Alqueidão =

19th-century fort in Portugal

- Forte do Alqueidão (Forte Grande)
- Sobral de Monte Agraço in Portugal
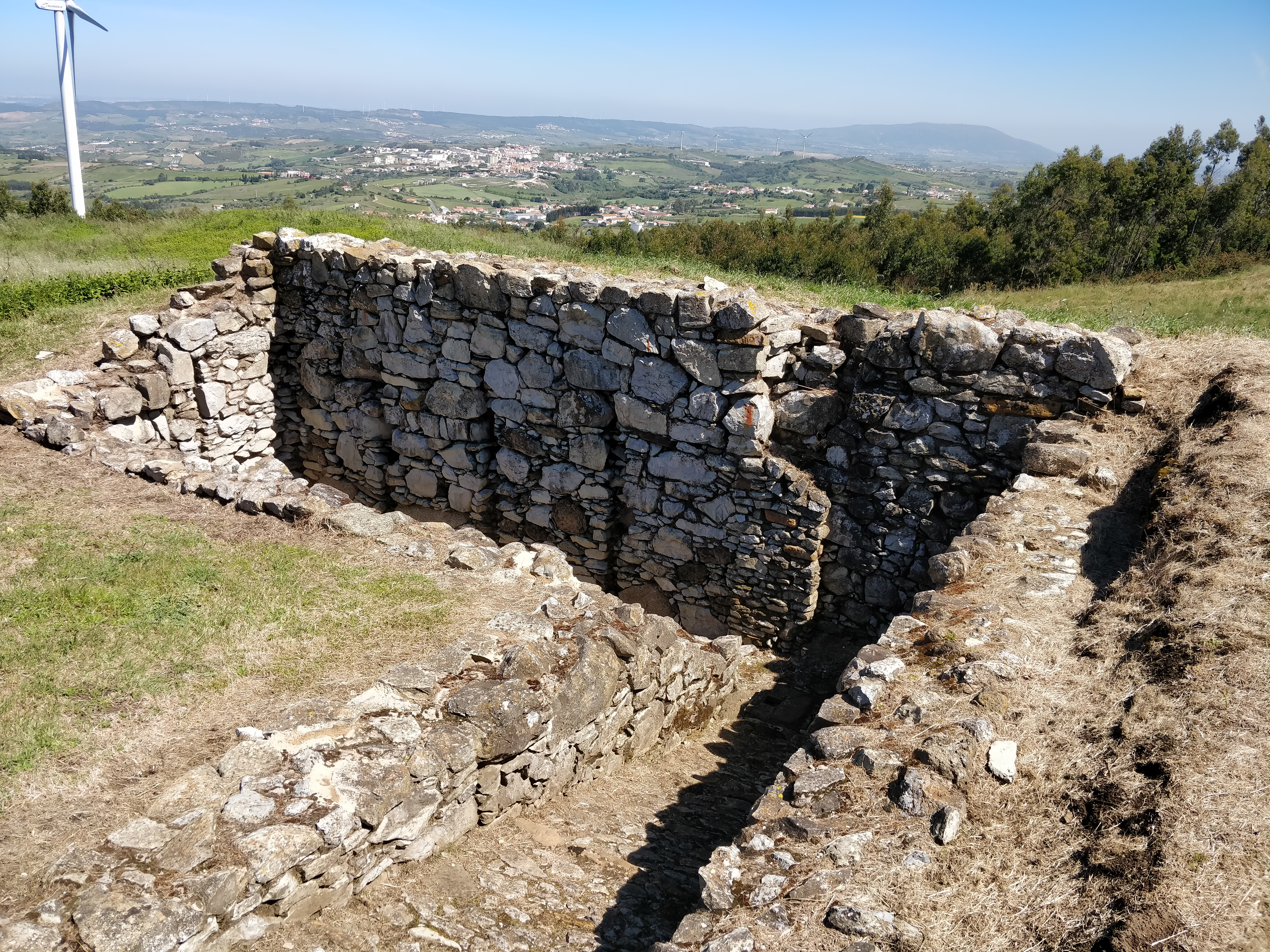
- Remains of a powder magazine

Site information
- Type: Fort
- Open to the public: Yes.
- Condition: Preserved and partly restored.

Location
- Coordinates: 38°59′14″N 9°09′04″W

Site history
- Built: 1809-10
- Built by: Duke of Wellington
- Fate: Peninsular War

The Fort of Alqueidão, also known as Forte Grande (Big Fort), is located about 2 kilometres south of the parish of Sobral de Monte Agraço, in the municipality of Sobral de Monte Agraço, in the Lisbon District of Portugal. It was one of the first and one of the largest of 152 military works known as the Lines of Torres Vedras that were built in 1809-10 to defend Lisbon during the Peninsular War (1807–14). The fort played a major role in stopping the advance of Napoleonic troops.

== History ==
Following the Treaty of Fontainebleau signed between France and Spain in October 1807, which provided for the invasion and subsequent division of Portuguese territory into three kingdoms, French troops under the command of General Junot entered Portugal, which requested support from the British. In July 1808 troops commanded by the Duke of Wellington, at the time known as Arthur Wellesley, landed in Portugal and defeated French troops at the Battles of Roliça and Vimeiro. This forced Junot to negotiate the Convention of Cintra, which led to the evacuation of the French army from Portugal.

However, the threat of further invasions by the French led Wellington, on October 20, 1809, to order the construction of defensive lines in order to protect Lisbon from Napoléon Bonaparte's troops and also to provide a route for his own evacuation should it be necessary. Work on the Fort of Alqueidão, as part of the first Line of defence, began on November 8, 1809, at more or less the same time as improvements to the Fort of São Julião da Barra, close to Lisbon, and construction of the new Fort of São Vicente at Torres Vedras, under the overall supervision of Colonel Richard Fletcher who was commander of the Royal Engineers. By October of the following year 126 forts, redoubts and other defences forming three lines of defence had been constructed over 80 kilometres, reinforcing the natural obstacles that the land offered and making maximum use of the existing topography.

A new French invasion was headed by Marechal Masséna. He was defeated in September 1810 by the Anglo-Portuguese army commanded by Wellington at the Battle of Buçaco. Despite this he forced the allies to retreat to the Lines of Torres Vedras, where a stalemate ensued for several months. Masséna’s troops were gathered around Sobral de Monte Agraço but he found the line of defences, centered on the Fort of Alqueidão, to be impregnable. He eventually had to retreat due to lack of food and supplies, withdrawing to the Spanish border. However, works on the Lines continued after the French withdrawal, with 152 works eventually being completed.

The fort is at 439 meters above sea level, on top of the Monte Agraço mountain range, and occupies an area of 3.5 hectares. It was part of a group of seven forts and redoubts in the 2nd section or district of the first of the Lines of Torres Vedras and designated No. 14 in the numbering system used for all of the works carried out on the lines. Work on Alqueidão began on 4 November 1809. Wellington’s headquarters were close by in the village of Pêro Negro, and, because of its commanding position, the fort served as the command post for the Lines. Using an optical telegraph signalling system, the fort could communicate with the Fort of Archeira to the south of Torres Vedras and from there to both the Fort of São Vicente to the north of the same town and the Atlantic coast.

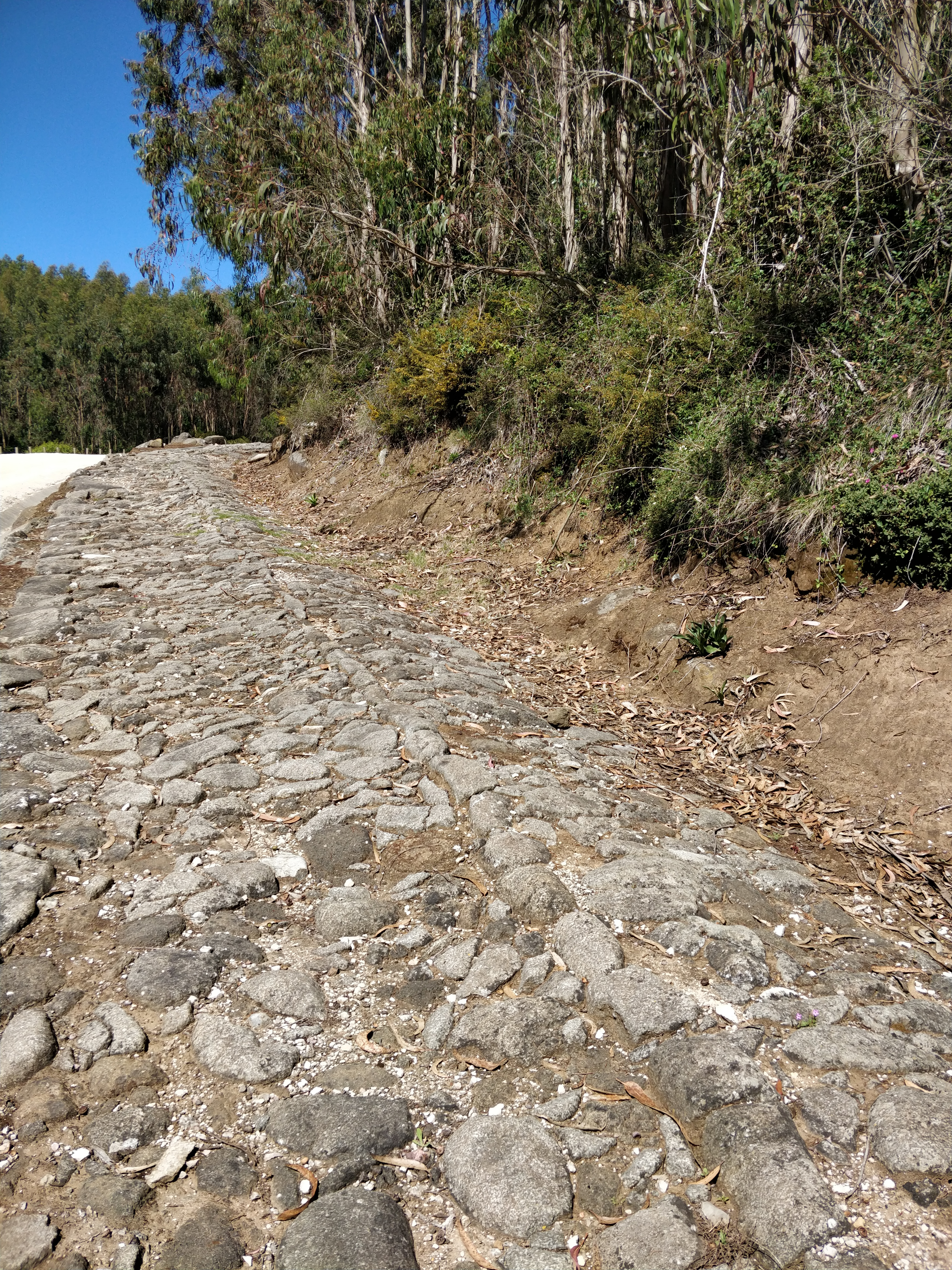
Part of the original road used to supply the fort

The Fort of Alqueidão had a garrison of 1,590 men, and was equipped with 24 cannon, believed to be 14 12-pounder artillery, six 9-pouders, and four 6-pounders. The troops were Portuguese, under the command of the British Brigadier-General Denis Pack, together with two artillery companies from Sobral formed and trained by William Beresford who was both a general in the British army and a marshal of the Portuguese army.

== The present day ==
As part of a programme of restoration to celebrate the bicentennial of the Lines, archaeological exploration was carried out between 2008 and 2011, using EEA and Norway Grants. This resulted in the identification of the sites of the Governor’s Barracks, a warehouse, a cistern, and armories. The archaeological studies not only added to the understanding of the construction techniques used but also discovered that the site had been first occupied during the Iron Age.

Restoration work at the same time included removing trees so that the commanding position of the fort could better be appreciated. In addition a concrete viewing platform was added, highlighting locations of other forts in the Lines.

== Neighbouring forts ==
In the immediate vicinity of the Fort of Alqueidão are three other forts, Machado, Novo, and Simplício, which exchanged crossfire with the Fort of Alqueidão and were connected by a military road that allowed the circulation of people and goods.

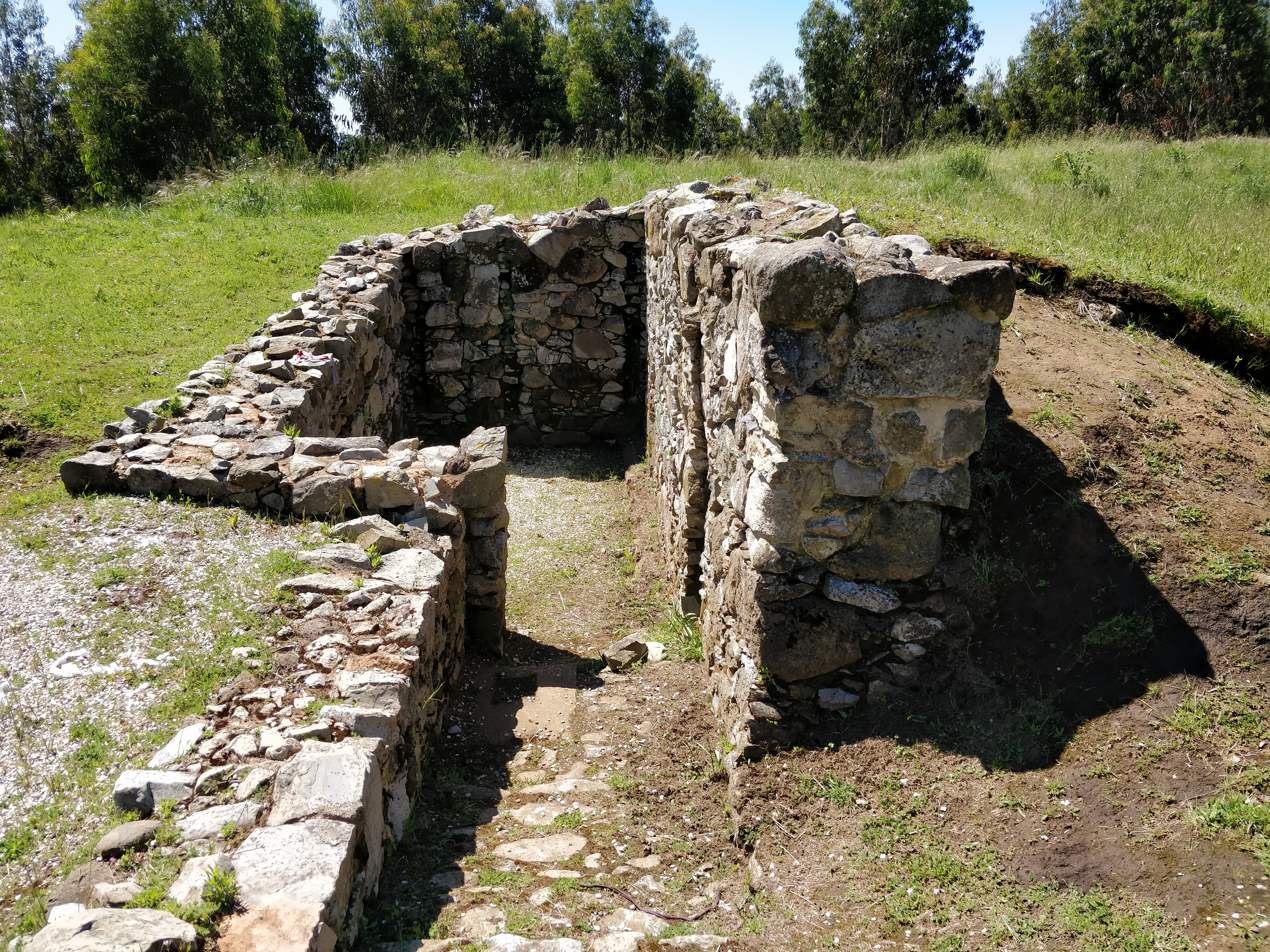
The Fort of Simplício: powder magazine

=== Fort of Simplício ===
The Fort of Simplício (Number 16) was the closest of the three forts to Alqueidão, a short distance to its south. It had a garrison of 300 men, with seven cannon and one howitzer. It was particularly well-sited to bombard the French troops from their rear should they break through and start to march in the direction of Lisbon.

=== Fort of Machado ===
Southwest of the Fort of Alqueidão, the Fort of Machado (Number 17) had room for 460 soldiers and was equipped with three 12-pounder cannon, three 9-pounders and one 6-pounder.

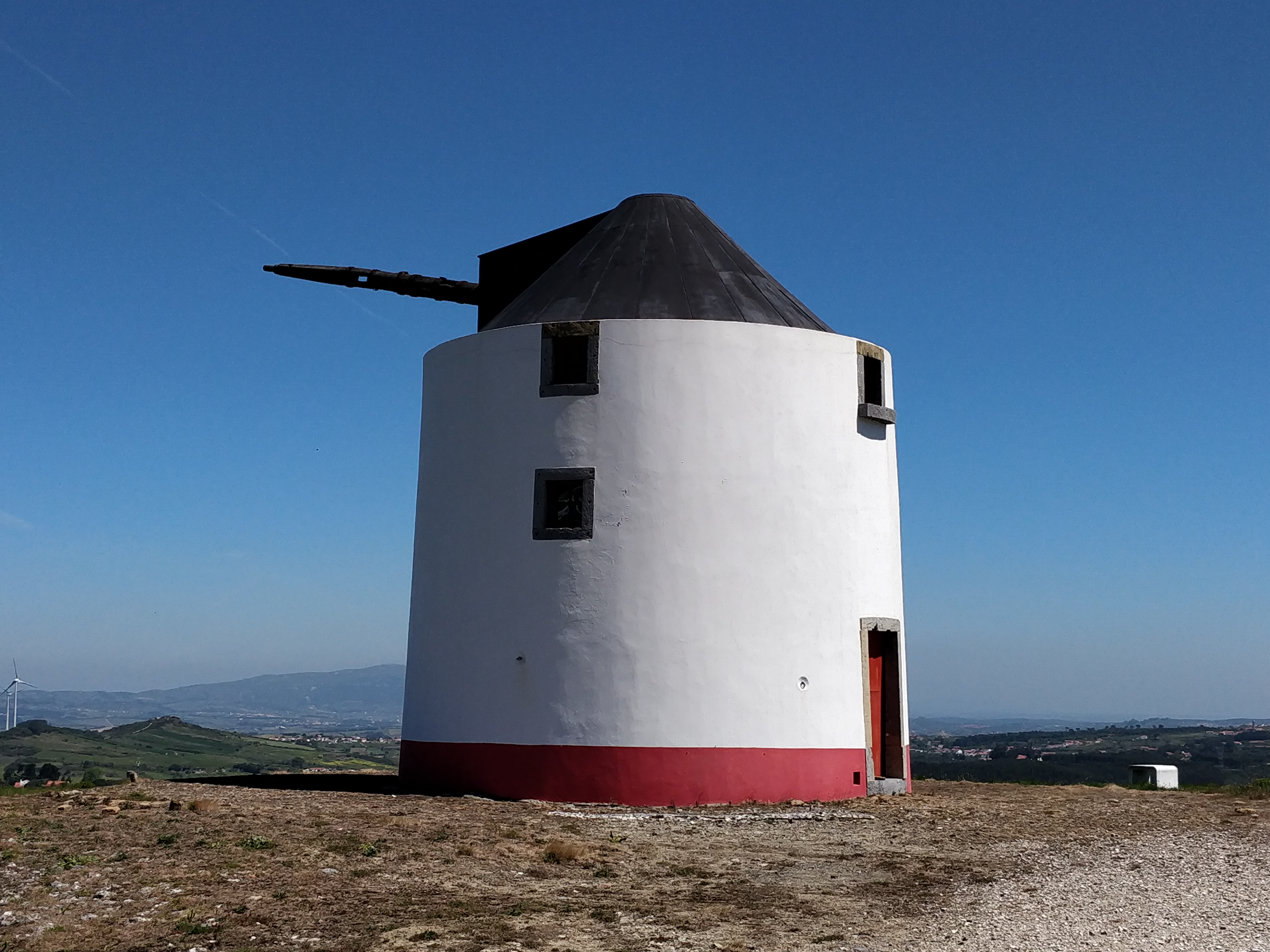
A view of Forte Novo. In building the Lines of Torres Vedras it was common to incorporate existing hilltop windmills in their design

=== Forte Novo ===
Slightly to the north of Alqueidão, the Forte Novo (New Fort: Number 152) served as an advanced defence for Alqueidão. It had a garrison of 250 men with four 12-pounder cannon and two 6-pounders.

== See also ==
- List of forts of the Lines of Torres Vedras
