= Fort of Olheiros =

19th-century fort in Portugal

- Lisbon District, Near Torres Vedras in Portugal
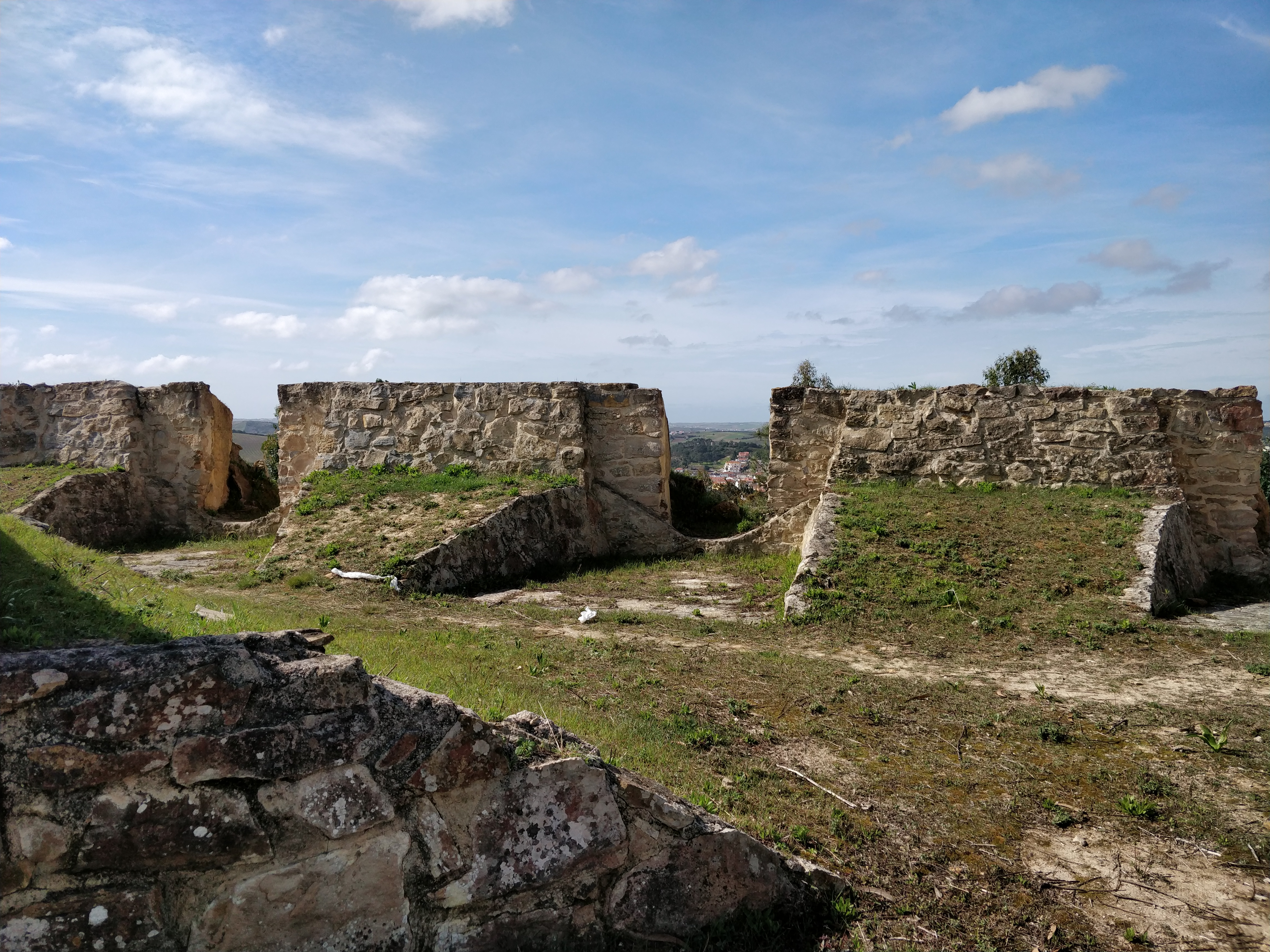
- Fort of Olheiros

Site information
- Type: Fort/Redoubt
- Open to the public: Yes

Location
- Coordinates: 39°06′12″N 9°16′13″W

Site history
- Built: 1809-10
- Built by: Duke of Wellington
- Fate: Preserved and restored

Garrison information
- Garrison: 180

The Fort of Olheiros (also known as the Fort of Canudo) was a small fort in the town and municipality of Torres Vedras, in the Lisbon District of Portugal. Situated at 105 metres above sea level, it was the most northerly of all the forts and other military facilities built in 1809-10 under the orders of the Duke of Wellington during the Peninsular War, and commonly known as the Lines of Torres Vedras.

== History ==
152 forts, redoubts and other defences, forming three lines of defence, were constructed over 80 kilometres, reinforcing the natural obstacles that the land offered and making maximum use of the existing topography. All sites were given numbers and the Fort of Olheiros was No. 23. Incorporating a windmill that was already on the site, it is situated a few hundred metres to the northwest of the much larger Fort of São Vicente, which is considered to have been the most important of the forts constructed for the Lines. Olheiros fort is an irregular polygon of seven sides, around 45 metres long by 19 metres wide. It has a pronounced stone-lined dry moat, with access having originally been over a drawbridge. There were eleven gun emplacements and a store for the munitions. In addition to covering the River Sizandro valley, as support to three forts in the Varatojo mountains and the Fort of Grillo, it was also designed to defend the western side of the Fort of São Vicente. It is believed that the fort’s garrison would have totalled 180 soldiers.

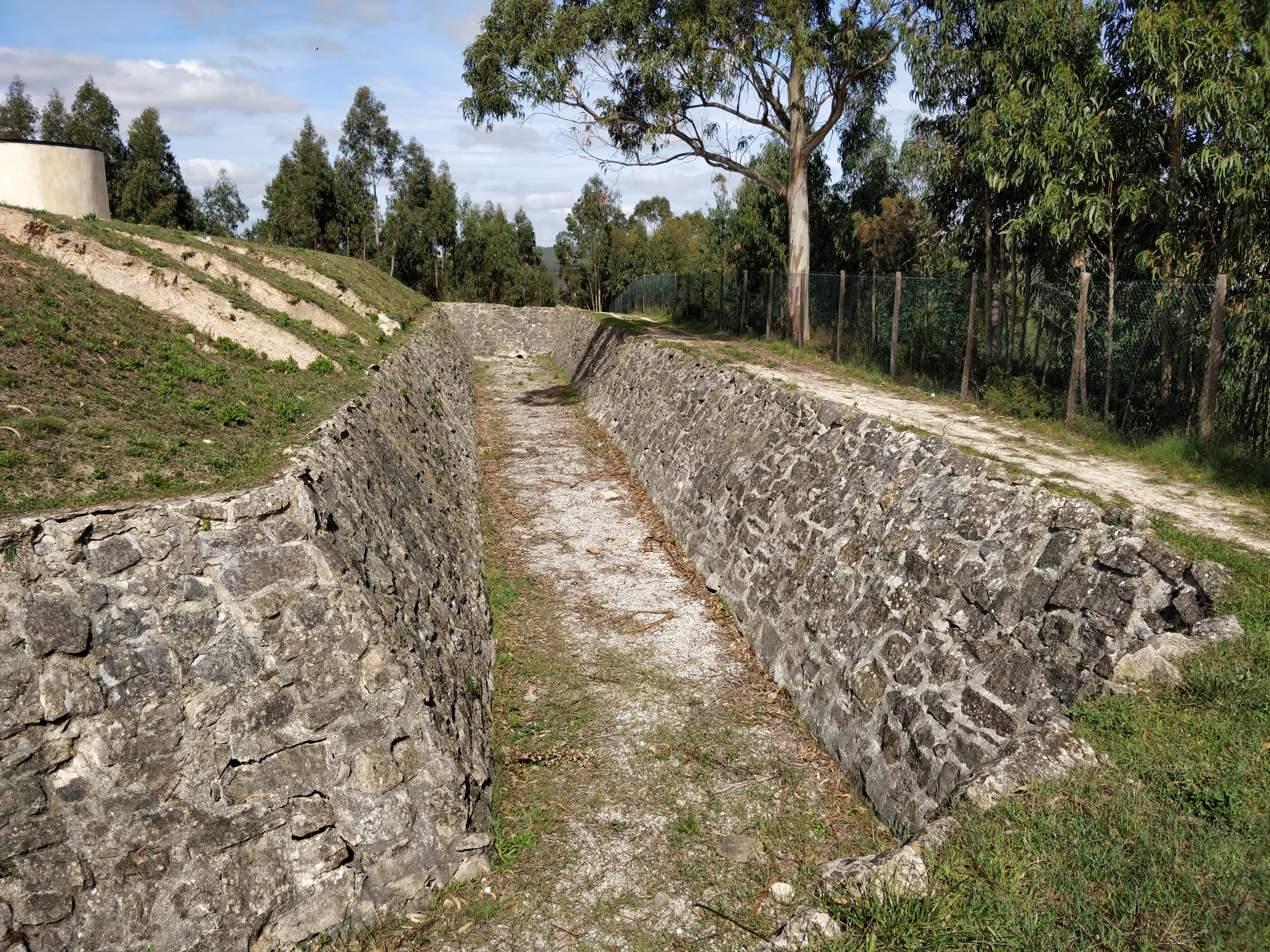
View of the stone-lined moat. The windmill originally on the site can be seen top left

== Tourism ==
The fort, like most of the other fortifications of the Lines of Torres Vedras, was disarmed and abandoned in 1818, three years after the Congress of Vienna brought peace to Europe. Some restoration was carried out in 1957, with support from the Calouste Gulbenkian Foundation. In 2011, the fort was restored at a cost of around €350,000, paid for with a European Economic Area grant. It can easily be visited in association with a visit to the Fort of São Vicente, which also houses a Lines of Torres Vedras Interpretation Centre.

== See also ==
- List of forts of the Lines of Torres Vedras
- Leonel Trindade Municipal Museum, Torres Vedras, which has an exhibition related to the Lines of Torres Vedras
