= Sobral de Monte Agraço (parish) =

- Civil parish
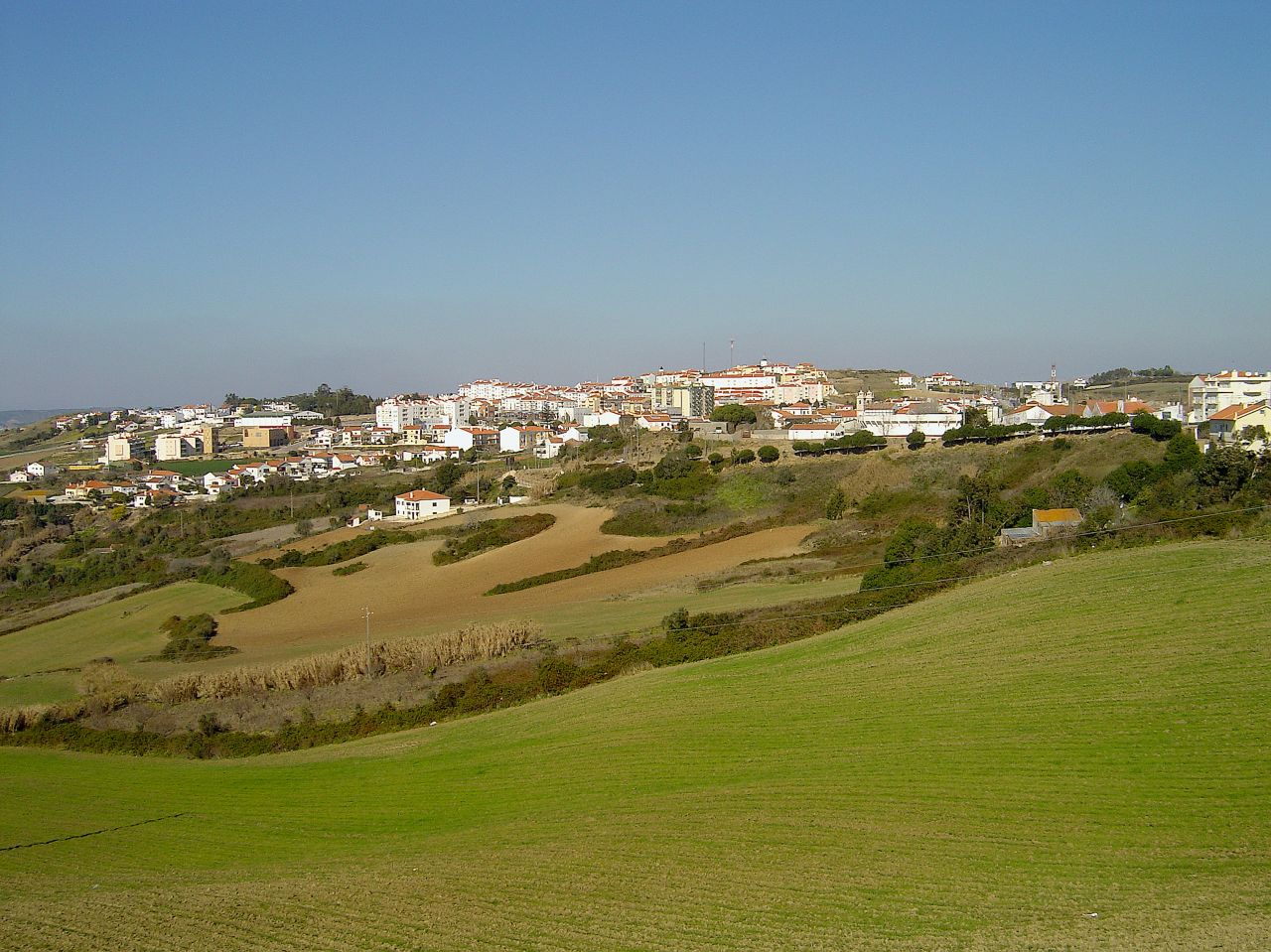
- View of Sobral de Monte Agraço

- Location in Portugal
- Coordinates: 39.018°N 9.152°W
- Country: Portugal
- Region: Oeste e Vale do Tejo
- Intermunic. comm.: Oeste
- District: Lisbon
- Municipality: Sobral de Monte Agraço

Area
  - Total: 8.70 km^{2} (3.36 sq mi)

Population (2011)
  - Total: 3,406
  - Density: 391/km^{2} (1,010/sq mi)
- Time zone: UTC+00:00 (WET)
  - Summer (DST): UTC+01:00 (WEST)

Sobral de Monte Agraço is a parish in Sobral de Monte Agraço Municipality in Portugal. The population in 2011 was 3,406, in an area of 8.70 km².
