= Fort of São Vicente =

19th-century fort in Portugal

- Lisbon District, Near Torres Vedras in Portugal
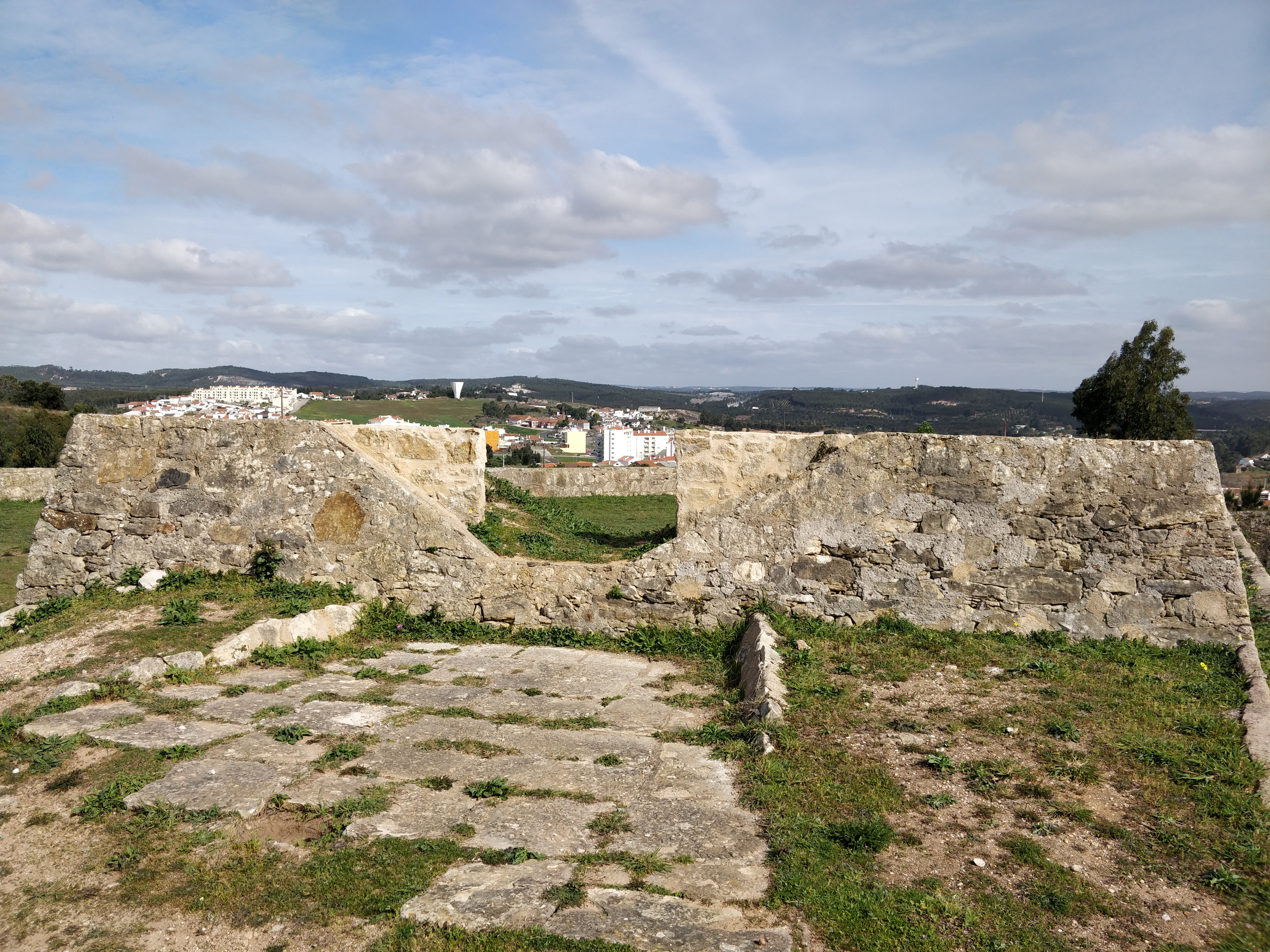
- Fort of São Vicente

Site information
- Type: Fortress
- Open to the public: Yes, including an interpretation centre

Location
- Coordinates: 39°06′01″N 9°15′55″W

Site history
- Built: 1809-10
- Built by: Duke of Wellington
- Fate: Preserved and restored

Garrison information
- Garrison: 2900

The Fort of São Vicente (St. Vincent) is in the town and municipality of Torres Vedras, in the Lisbon District of Portugal. In 1809 it was the first of 152 forts, redoubts and other defences to be developed as part of three defensive lines between the Atlantic Ocean and the River Tagus that were designed by the Duke of Wellington to protect the Portuguese capital, Lisbon, from possible invasion by French troops during the Peninsular War. These came to be known as the Lines of Torres Vedras. Together with the Fort of Alqueidão, it is considered the most important fortress of those constructed for the Lines.

== History ==
Following the Treaty of Fontainebleau signed between France and Spain in October 1807, which provided for the invasion and subsequent division of Portuguese territory into three kingdoms, French troops under the command of General Junot entered Portugal, which requested support from the British. Thus, in July 1808 troops commanded by the Duke of Wellington, at the time known as Arthur Wellesley, landed in Portugal and defeated French troops at the Battles of Roliça and Vimeiro. This forced Junot to negotiate the Convention of Cintra, which led to the evacuation of the French army from Portugal. In March 1809, Marshal Soult led a new French expedition that advanced south to the city of Porto before being repulsed by Portuguese-British troops and forced to withdraw.

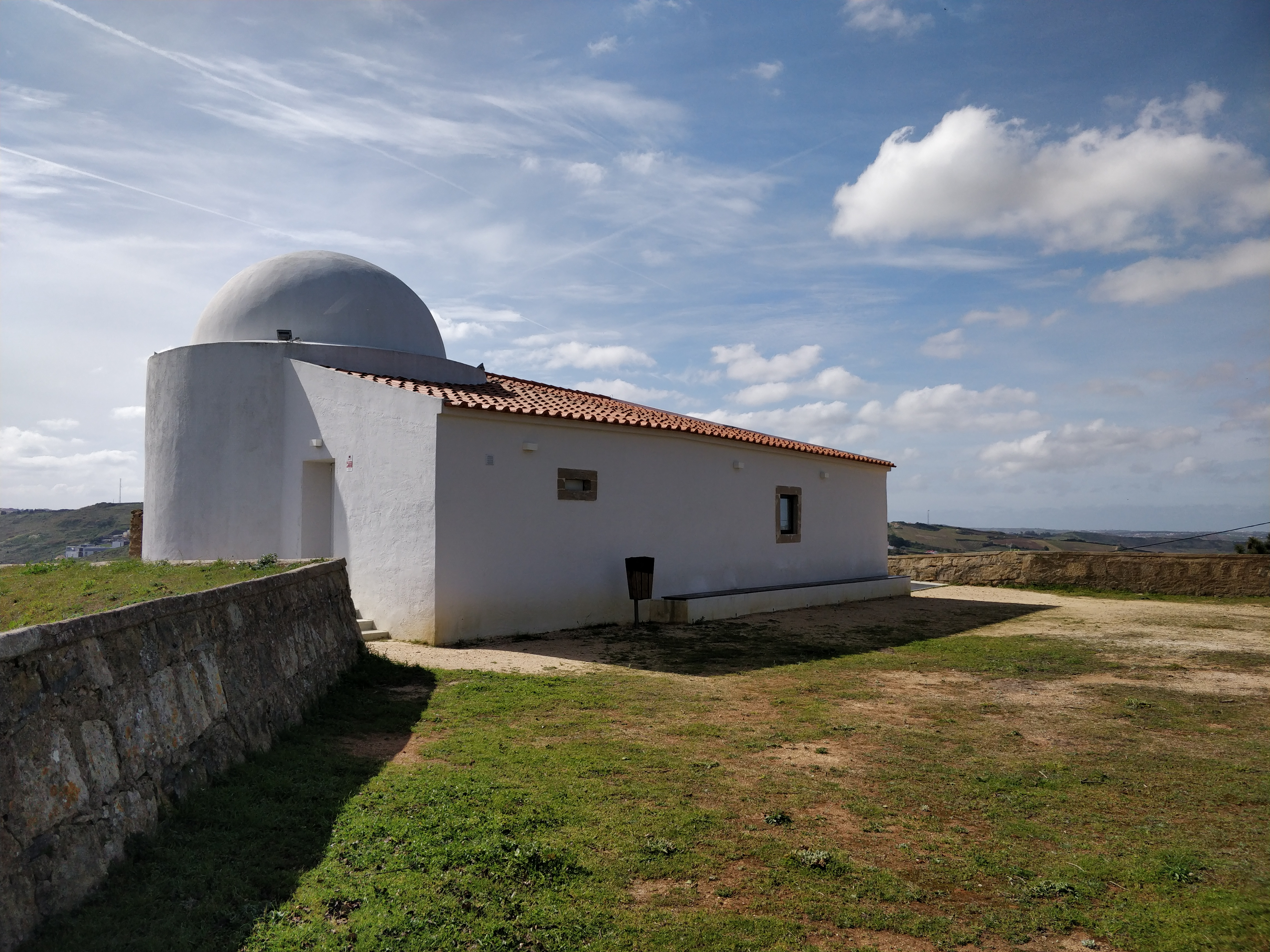
The Chapel of São Vicente, now housing a Lines of Torres Vedras Interpretation Centre

However, the threat of further invasions by the French led Wellington, on October 20, 1809, to order the construction of defensive lines in order to protect Lisbon from Napoléon Bonaparte's troops. Work on the Fort of São Vicente as part of the first line of defence began on November 8, 1809, at more or less the same time as improvements to the Fort of São Julião da Barra, close to Lisbon, and construction of the new Fort of Alqueidão to the southeast of Torres Vedras near Sobral de Monte Agraço, under the overall supervision of Colonel Richard Fletcher who was commander of the Royal Engineers. A total of 152 forts, redoubts and other defences forming three lines of defence were eventually constructed over 80 kilometres, reinforcing the natural obstacles that the land offered and making maximum use of the existing topography. In addition to protecting Lisbon, the defensive lines were also designed to cover Wellington’s own retreat and possible evacuation from a beach close to the Fort of São Julião da Barra, if his troops were overwhelmed by French forces.

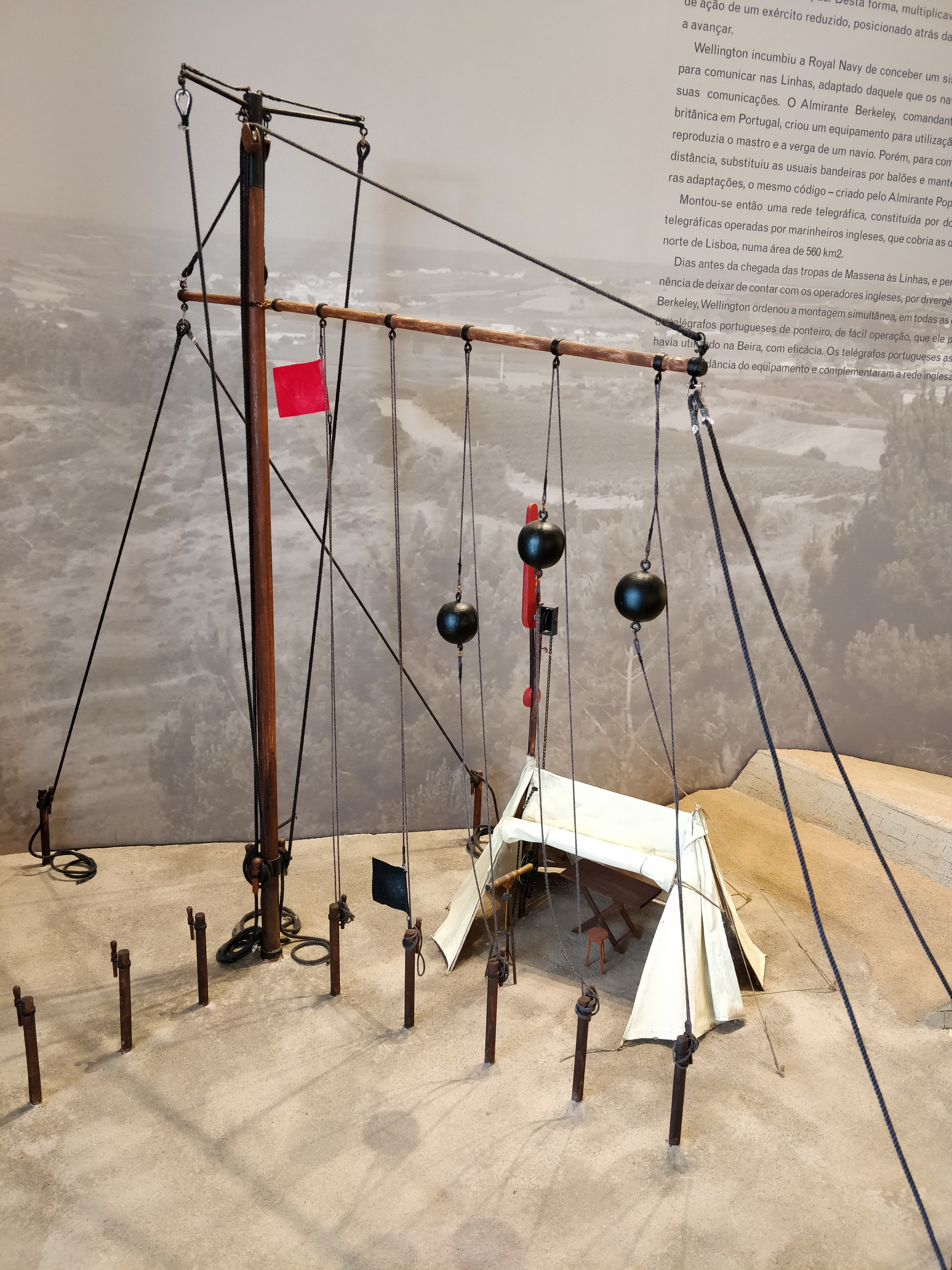
A model of Wellington's system for communicating between forts, in the fort's Interpretation Centre

The third French invasion was headed by Marshal André Masséna. He was defeated in September 1810 by the Anglo-Portuguese army commanded by Wellington at the Battle of Buçaco. Despite this he forced the allies to retreat to the Lines of Torres Vedras, where a stalemate ensued for several months. He eventually had to retreat due to lack of food and supplies, withdrawing to the Spanish border. Thus the Fort of São Vicente did not see action during the Peninsular War. It finally saw action in 1846 when, during the so-called Little Civil War, it was the scene of a battle between the attacking troops of the Duke of Saldanha and the besieged forces of the Count of Bonfim. This was the only time a force has directly attacked one of the fortifications of the Lines. After the Convention of Gramido in 1847 brought peace to Portugal, most of the forts ceased to have any military function and were allowed to gradually fall into ruin.

== Features ==
The Fort of São Vicente was one of the most fortified of the forts of the first line. Built on top of a hill with a Y-shaped design, it consisted of a set of three strongholds, originally separated by three removable bridges, and surrounded by a perimeter wall about 1,500 metres in length. All of the defensive installations of the Lines of Torres Vedras were given numbers and these three strongholds were Nos. 20-22. The fort had 39 cannon and was garrisoned by 2,200 men, being able to hold up to 4,000 if necessary. It also housed a signals post. The existing Castle of Torres Vedras, a short distance away, was incorporated into the same defensive line, having eleven cannon. Together they defended the main road between Lisbon and Coimbra, which went through a narrow valley between the two hills. The fort was built on the site of a small chapel, dedicated to St. Vincent and dating back to the 12th century. This was incorporated into the design.

== Tourism ==
The Fort of São Vicente has not undergone major alterations since construction, and restoration work has been faithful to the original design. A Lines of Torres Vedras Interpretation Centre, which is sited in the chapel at the fort, was opened in July 2017. It includes a model of the means by which signals were exchanged between the forts of the lines and also presents a short video describing the history of the Lines.

== See also ==
- Lines of Wellington. A movie starring John Malkovich as Wellington that includes scenes shot in Fort of São Vicente.
- Leonel Trindade Municipal Museum in Torres Vedras, which has an exhibition on the Lines of Torres Vedras.
