= Lines of Torres Vedras =

1809–1811 military defences during the Peninsular War

Peninsular War: Portugal
1807 1808 1809 1810 1811

The Lines of Torres Vedras were lines of forts and other military defences built in secrecy to defend Lisbon during the Peninsular War. Named after the nearby town of Torres Vedras, they were ordered by Arthur Wellesley, Viscount Wellington, constructed by Colonel Richard Fletcher and his Portuguese workers between November 1809 and September 1810, and used to stop Marshal Masséna's 1810 offensive. The Lines were declared a National Heritage by the Portuguese Government in March 2019.

== Development ==
At the beginning of the Peninsular War (1807–14) France and Spain signed the Treaty of Fontainebleau in October 1807. This provided for the invasion and subsequent division of Portuguese territory into three kingdoms. Subsequently, French troops under the command of General Junot entered Portugal, which requested support from the British. In August 1808 troops commanded by Sir Arthur Wellesley, the later Duke of Wellington, landed in Portugal and defeated French troops at the Battles of Roliça and Vimeiro. This forced Junot to negotiate the Convention of Cintra, which led to the evacuation of the French army from Portugal. In March 1809, Marshal Soult led a new French expedition that advanced south to the city of Porto before being repulsed by Portuguese-British troops and forced to withdraw. After this retreat, Wellesley's forces advanced into Spain to join 33,000 Spanish troops under General Cuesta. At Talavera, some 120 kilometres (75 mi) southwest of Madrid, they encountered and defeated 46,000 French soldiers under Marshal Claude Victor. After the Battle of Talavera, Wellington realised that he was seriously outnumbered by the French army, giving rise to the possibility that he could be forced to retreat to Portugal and possibly evacuate. He decided to strengthen the proposed evacuation area around the Fort of São Julião da Barra on the estuary of the River Tagus, near Lisbon.

== Planning ==
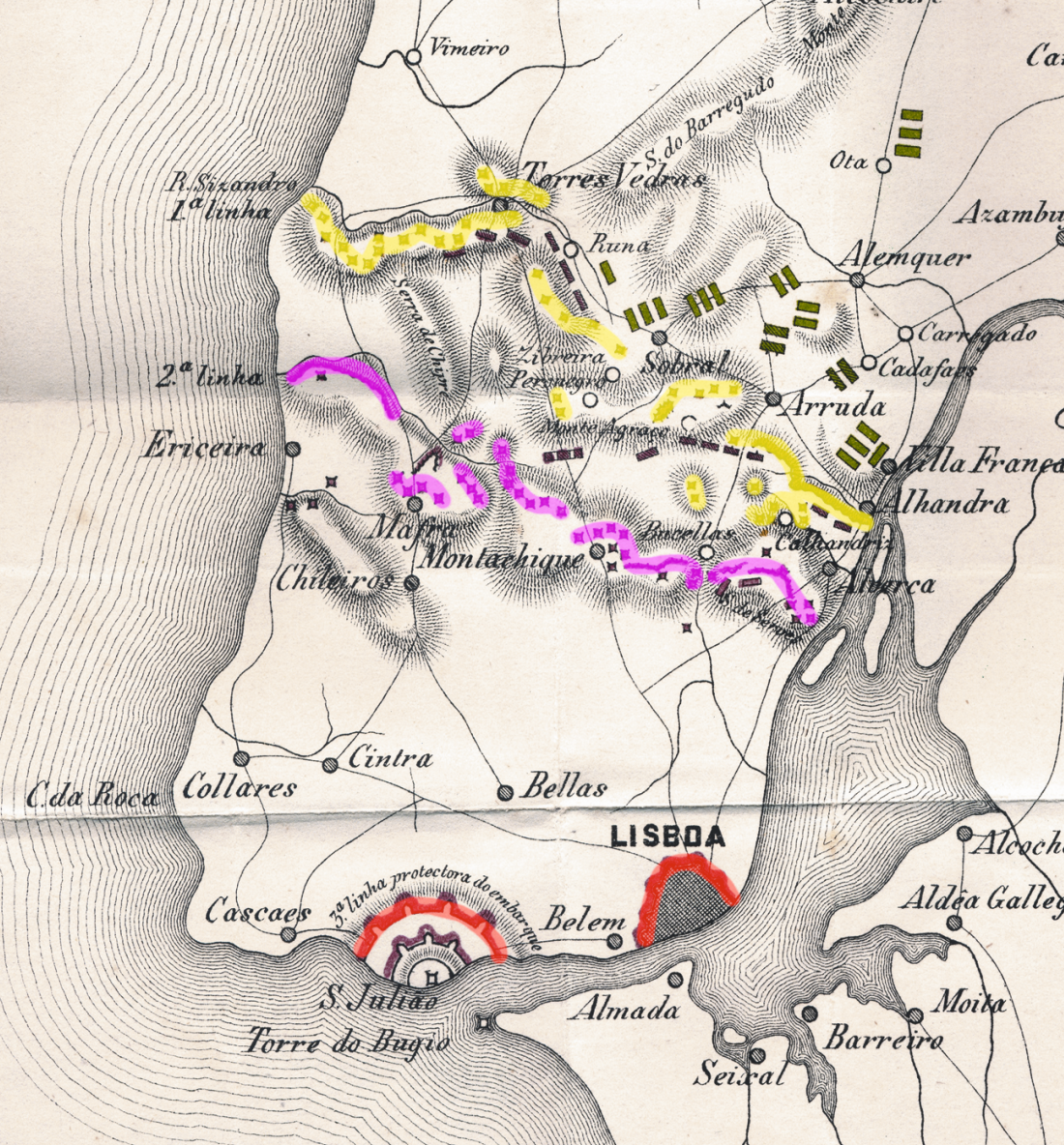
Map of the Lines of Torres Vedras

In October 1809, Wellington, drawing on topographical maps prepared by José Maria das Neves Costa, and making use of a report that was prepared for General Junot in 1807, surveyed the area north of Lisbon with Lieutenant-Colonel Richard Fletcher. Eventually they chose the terrain from Torres Vedras to Lisbon because of its mountainous characteristics. From north to south, great undulations created peaks that straddled deep valleys, great gullies and wide ravines. The rugged and inhospitable area offered numerous possibilities for a stubborn rearguard fight from forts on many of the peaks.

Following the decision on the location, Lieutenant-Colonel Richard Fletcher ordered the work to begin on a network of interlocking fortifications, redoubts, escarpments, dams that flooded large areas, and other defences. Roads were also built to enable troops to move rapidly between forts. The work was supervised by Fletcher, assisted by Major John Thomas Jones, and 11 other British Officers, four Portuguese Army Engineers, and two KGL officers. The cost was less than £200,000 (equivalent to £13,579,000 in 2025) according to the Royal Engineers, one of the least expensive but most productive military investments in history.

When the results of the surveys by the Royal Engineers were completed, it was possible, in February 1810, to begin work on 150 smaller interlinking defensive positions, using, wherever possible, the natural features of the landscape. The work was accelerated after the loss to the French of the fortress at the Siege of Almeida in August 1810, which prompted the public conscription of Portuguese labourers to work on the lines. The works were sufficiently complete to halt the advance of the French troops, who arrived in October of the same year. Even after the French had retreated from Portugal, construction of the lines continued in expectation of their return, and in 1812 34,000 men were still working on them. On completion there were 152 fortifications with a total of 648 cannon.

== Construction ==
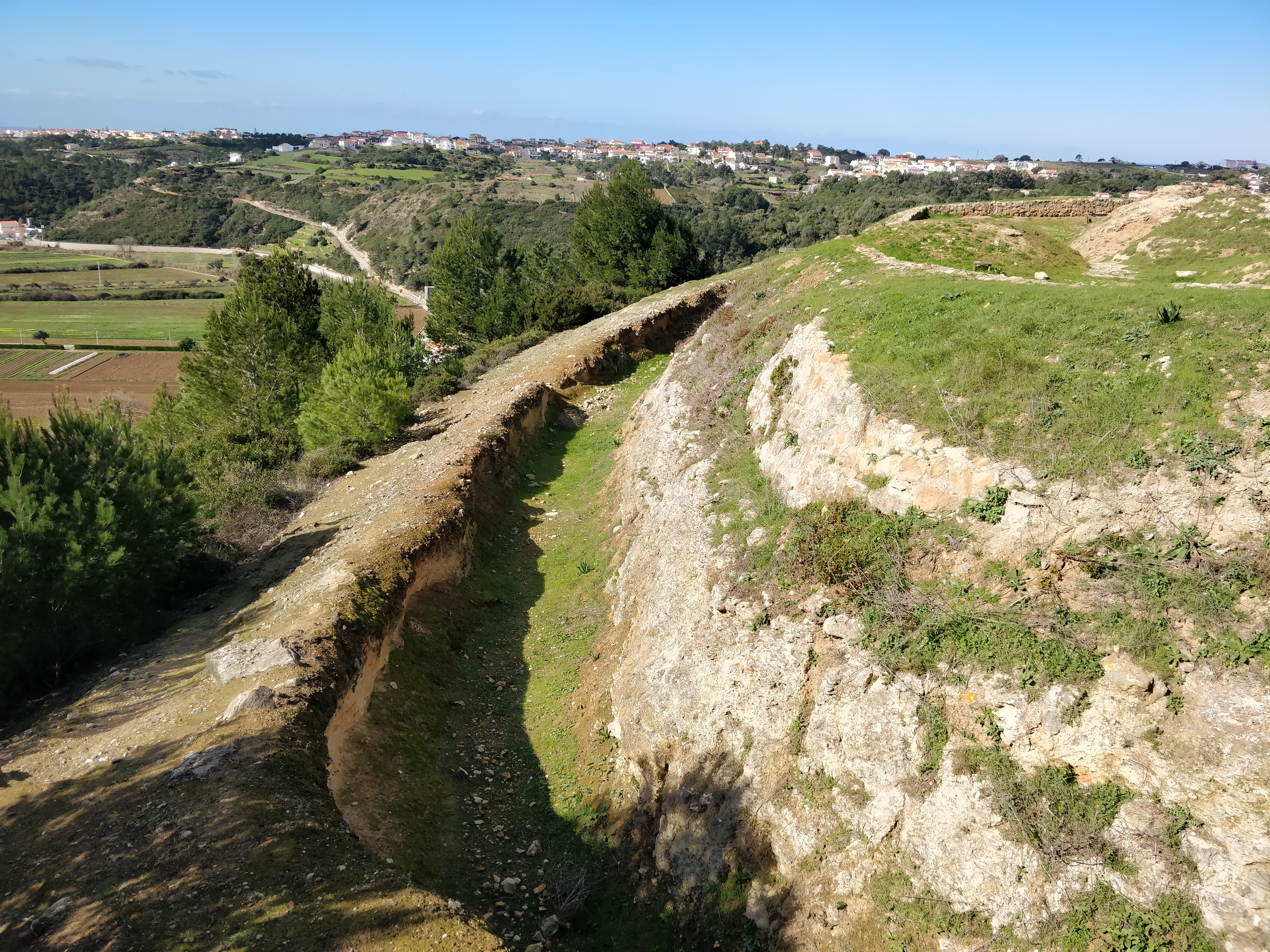
Dry moat at the Fort of Zambujal

The work began on the main defensive works on 3 November 1809, initially at the Fort of São Julião da Barra and almost immediately afterwards at the Fort of São Vicente (St. Vincent) overlooking the town of Torres Vedras and at the Fort of Alqueidão on top of Monte Agraço. The entire construction was carried out in great secrecy and the French never became aware of it. Only one report appeared in the London newspapers, a major source of information for Napoleon. It is said that the British government did not know about the forts and was stunned when Wellington first said in dispatches that he had retreated to them. Even the British Ambassador in Lisbon appears to have been unaware of what was happening. These defences were accompanied by a scorched earth policy to their north in which the inhabitants were told to leave their farms, destroying all food they could not take and anything else that might be useful to the French. Although ultimately contributing to the success of the defence, this policy led to high rates of mortality among the Portuguese who had retreated south of the lines. By some estimates 40,000 died.

Labour for construction of the forts was supplied by Portuguese regiments from Lisbon, by hired Portuguese and, ultimately, through conscription of the whole district. The 152 works were supervised by just 18 engineers. The Lines were not continuous, as in the case of a defensive wall, but consisted of a series of mutually supporting forts and other defences that both guarded roads that the French could take and also covered each other’s flanks. The majority of the defences were redoubts holding 200 to 300 troops and three to six cannon, normally 12-pounders, which could fire canister shot or cannonballs. Each redoubt was protected by a ditch or dry moat, with parapets, and was palisaded. By the time the French reached the First Line in October 1810, 126 works had been completed and were manned by 29,750 men with 247 heavy guns. Wellington did not use his front-line troops to man the forts: instead, manpower was mainly provided by the Portuguese. Construction continued after the withdrawal of the French and was not fully completed until 1812.

Originally the Second Line was intended to be the main line of defence, 30 km (19 mi) north of Lisbon. The First Line, or Outer Line, was approximately 10 km (6.2 mi) to north of the Second Line. The original purpose of the First Line was to only delay the French. In fact, the First Line was not the original plan, the work was only carried out because the defenders were given extra time due to the slow advance of the French Army. In the end, the First Line succeeded in holding the French and the Second Line was never required. A Third Line, surrounding the Fort of São Julião da Barra near Lisbon, was built to protect Wellington’s evacuation by sea from the fort. A fourth line, of which little remains, was built south of the Tagus opposite Lisbon to prevent a French invasion of the city by boat.

=== First line ===
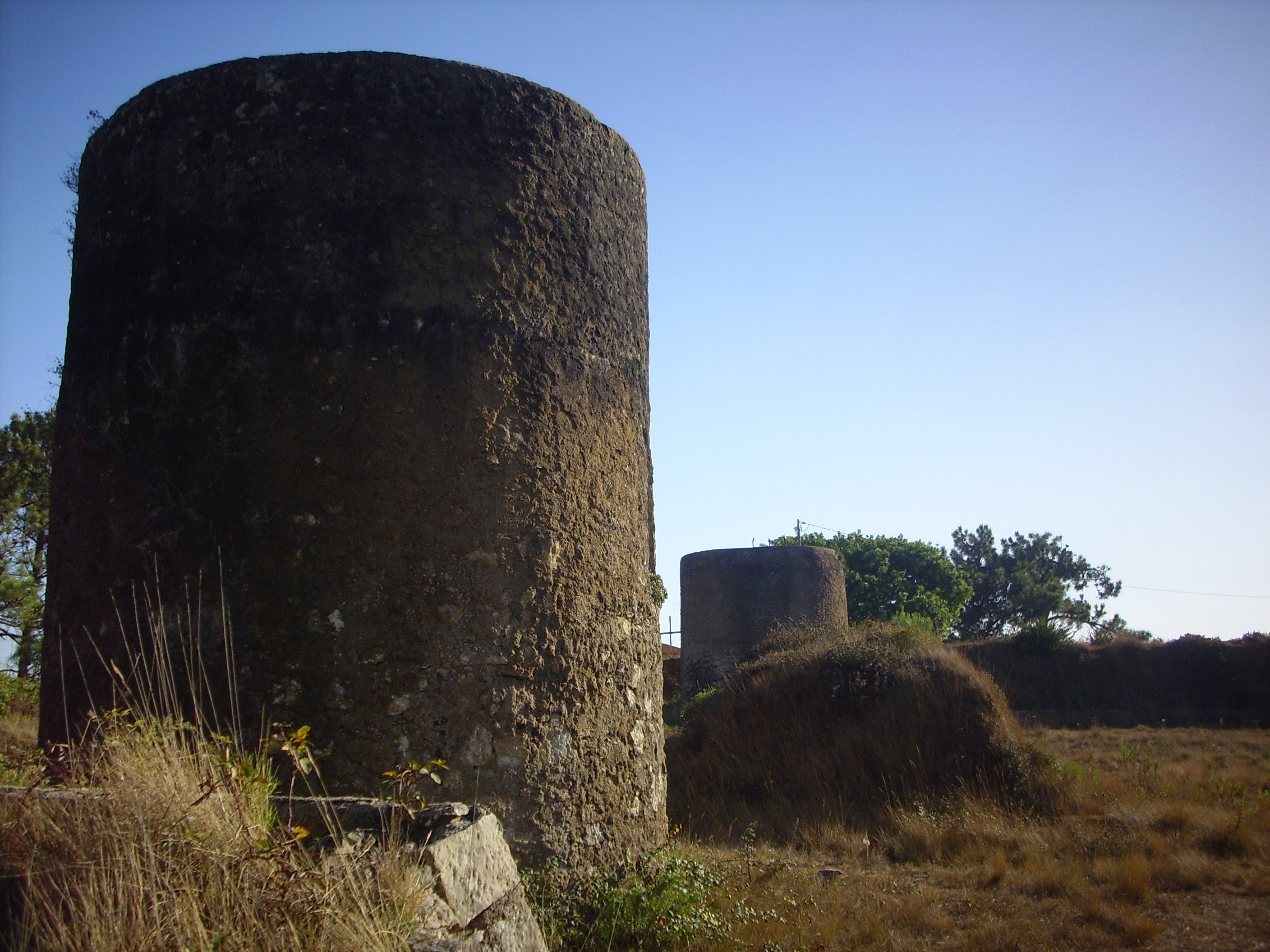
Remains of a redoubt at the lines of Torres Vedras.

Wellington's first idea had been to construct the first line from Alhandra on the banks of the Tagus to Rio São Lourenço on the Atlantic coast, with advanced works at Torres Vedras, Sobral de Monte Agraço, and other commanding points. The delays to the French arrival, however, enabled him to strengthen the first line sufficiently to warrant aiming to hold it permanently rather than just using it for delaying purposes. Surveying this line from east to west, the first section from Alhandra to Arruda was about 5 miles (8.0 km) long, of which 1 mile (1.6 km) towards the Tagus had been inundated; another 1 mile (1.6 km) or more had been scarped into a precipice, and the most vulnerable point had been obstructed by a huge abatis. The additional defences included 23 redoubts mounting 96 guns, besides a flotilla of gunboats to guard the right flank on the Tagus. This area was under the command of Hill's division. Defences still visible in this section include the Fort of Subserra.

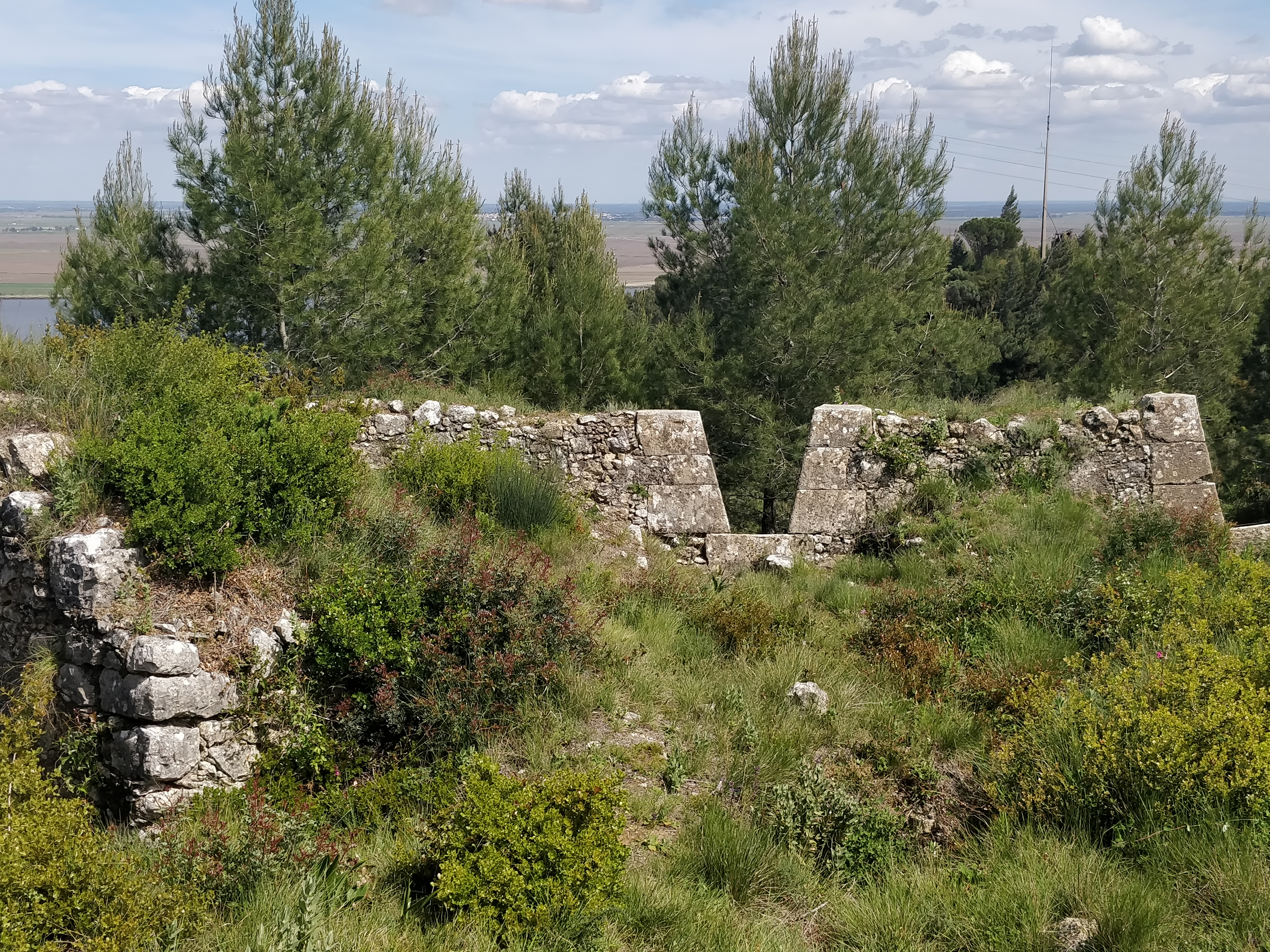
The Fort of Subserra. No 114 of the forts in the Lines. Also known as the Fort of Alhandra

The second section extended from Arruda to the west of Monte Agraço, which was crowned by the very large fort now known as the Fort of Alqueidão, mounting twenty-five guns, with three smaller forts to support it. Monte Agraço itself was held by Pack's brigade with Anglo-Portuguese 5th Division (Leith's) in reserve behind it, while the less completely fortified country to the east was entrusted to the British Light Division.

The third section stretched from the west of Monte Agraço for nearly 8 miles (13 km) to the gorge of the river Sizandro, a little to south of Torres Vedras. This was strengthened by two redoubts which commanded the road from Sobral to Montachique. Here, therefore, were concentrated the 1st, 4th, and 6th divisions, under the eye of Wellington himself, who established his headquarters at Pero Negro, where he remained from approximately 16 October 1810 to 15 November 1810.

The last and most westerly section of the first line ran from the gorge of the Sizandro to the sea, a distance of nearly 12 miles (19 km), more than half of which, however, on the western side had been rendered impassable by the damming of the Sizandro and by the conversion of its lower reaches into one huge inundation. The chief defence consisted of the entrenched camp of the Fort of São Vicente, a little to the north of Torres Vedras, which dominated the paved road leading from Leiria to Lisbon. The force assigned to this part of the Line was Picton's division.

=== Second line ===
The second line of defence was still more formidable. It can broadly be divided into three sections, from the Fort of Casa on the Tagus to Bucelas, from Bucelas to Mafra, and from Mafra to the sea, a total distance of 22 miles (35 km). The main forts along this line that remain identifiable are three forts on the Serra da Aguieira that served to support the Fort of Casa in its defence of the River Tagus as well as covering the Bucelas Gorge. They also exchanged crossfire with the Fort of Arpim to their north, which was a link between the first and second lines as it was close to three other forts designed to protect the road from Bucelas to Alverca do Ribatejo. To the west of Bucelas was a line of hill-top forts dominated by the Montachique mountain. The mountain, at an altitude of 408 metres, was not fortified but was defended by what are today known as the Fort of Mosqueiro, the Fort of Ribas and others. Closer to Mafra, overlooking the town of Malveira, was the Fort of Feira, which was at the centre of a complex of 19 strongholds in the second Line. Mafra was one of the principle positions on the second line, with its defences being centred around the Tapada or royal park.

=== Third and fourth lines ===
In the event of failure even in the face of all these precautions, a very powerful line, 2 miles (3.2 km) long, was thrown up around the Fort of São Julião da Barra on the Tagus estuary to cover a retreat and any embarkation if it became necessary. This was considered to be the third line.

British ships dominated the Portuguese coast and the Tagus estuary, so a waterborne invasion by the French was unlikely. However, to guard against the possibility that the French would try to bypass the lines to the north of Lisbon by heading south along the left bank of the Tagus and then approaching Lisbon by boat, a fourth line was built south of the Tagus in the Almada area. The line was 7.3 kilometres (4.5 mi) long. It had 17 redoubts and covered trenches, 86 pieces of artillery, and was defended by marines and orderlies from Lisbon, with a total of 7,500 men.

== Holding the Lines ==
The Anglo-Portuguese Army was forced to retreat to the first line after winning the Battle of Buçaco on 27 September 1810. The French army under Marshal Masséna discovered a barren land (under the scorched earth policy) and an enemy behind an almost impenetrable defensive position. Masséna's forces arrived at the lines on 11 October and took Sobral de Monte Agraço the following day. On 14 October the VIII Corps tried to push forward but at the Battle of Sobral they were repelled in an attempt to assault a strong British outpost. After attempting to wait out the enemy, the lack of food and fodder in the area north of the lines meant that Masséna was forced to order a French retreat northwards, starting on the night of 14/15 November 1810, to find an area that had not been subjected to the scorched earth policy.

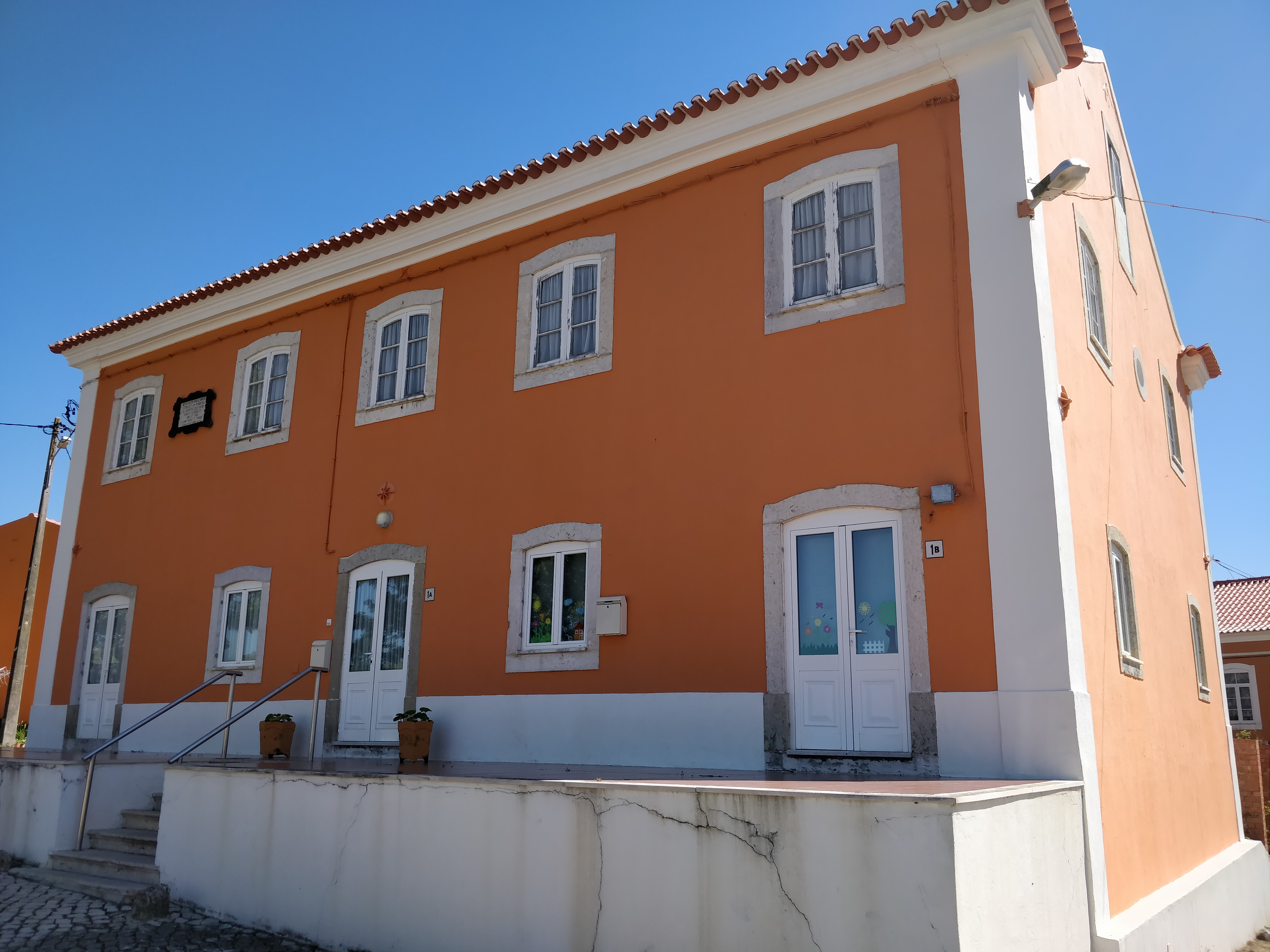
Duke of Wellington's Headquarters at Pero Negro

In December 1810, fearing a French attempt on the left of the Tagus, a chain of 17 redoubts was constructed from Almada to Trafaria. However, the French made no movement, and after holding out through February, when starvation really set in, Marshal Masséna ordered a retreat at the beginning of March 1811, taking a month to get to Spain.

Marshal Masséna had begun his campaign with his 65,000 strong army (l'Armée de Portugal). After losing 4,000 at the Battle of Buçaco, he arrived at Torres Vedras with 61,000 men in October 1810 facing attrition warfare. When he eventually returned to Spain in April 1811, he had lost a further 21,000 men, mostly from starvation, severe illness and disease. Casualties had not been helped by the fact that the Iberian peninsula had suffered one of the coldest winters it had ever known.

When the Allies renewed their offensive in 1811, they were reinforced with fresh British troops. The advance started from the Lines of Torres Vedras shortly after the French retreat. Although work continued on certain sections of the lines, they saw no further action during rest of the Peninsular War.

=== Garrisons ===
The lines were divided up into districts by Wellington in a letter dated 6 October 1810. Each district was allocated one Captain and one Lieutenant of Engineers:

1. From Torres Vedras to the sea. HQ at Torres Vedras.
2. From Sobral de Monte Agraço to the valley of Calhandriz. HQ at Sobral de Monte Agraço.
3. From Alhandra to the valley of Calhandriz. HQ at Alhandra.
4. From the banks of the Tagus, near Alverca, to the Pass of Bucelas, inclusive. HQ at Bucelas.
5. From the Pass of Freixal, near Bucelas to the right of the Pass of Mafra. HQ at Montachique.
6. From the Pass of Mafra to the sea. HQ at Mafra.

The total number of troops available to Wellington amounted, exclusive of two battalions of marines around the Fort of São Julião, to 42,000 British, of whom 35,000 were combat ready together with over 27,000 Portuguese regulars, of whom 24,000 were combat ready; about 12,000 Portuguese militia; and 20–30,000 ordenanças, a Portuguese militia force used mainly for guerrilla warfare. Lastly, the Marquis of la Romana contributed 8,000 Spanish troops to the lines around Mafra. Altogether, therefore, Wellington had some 60,000 regular frontline troops whom he could depend upon, and 20,000 more who could be trusted to man the lines.

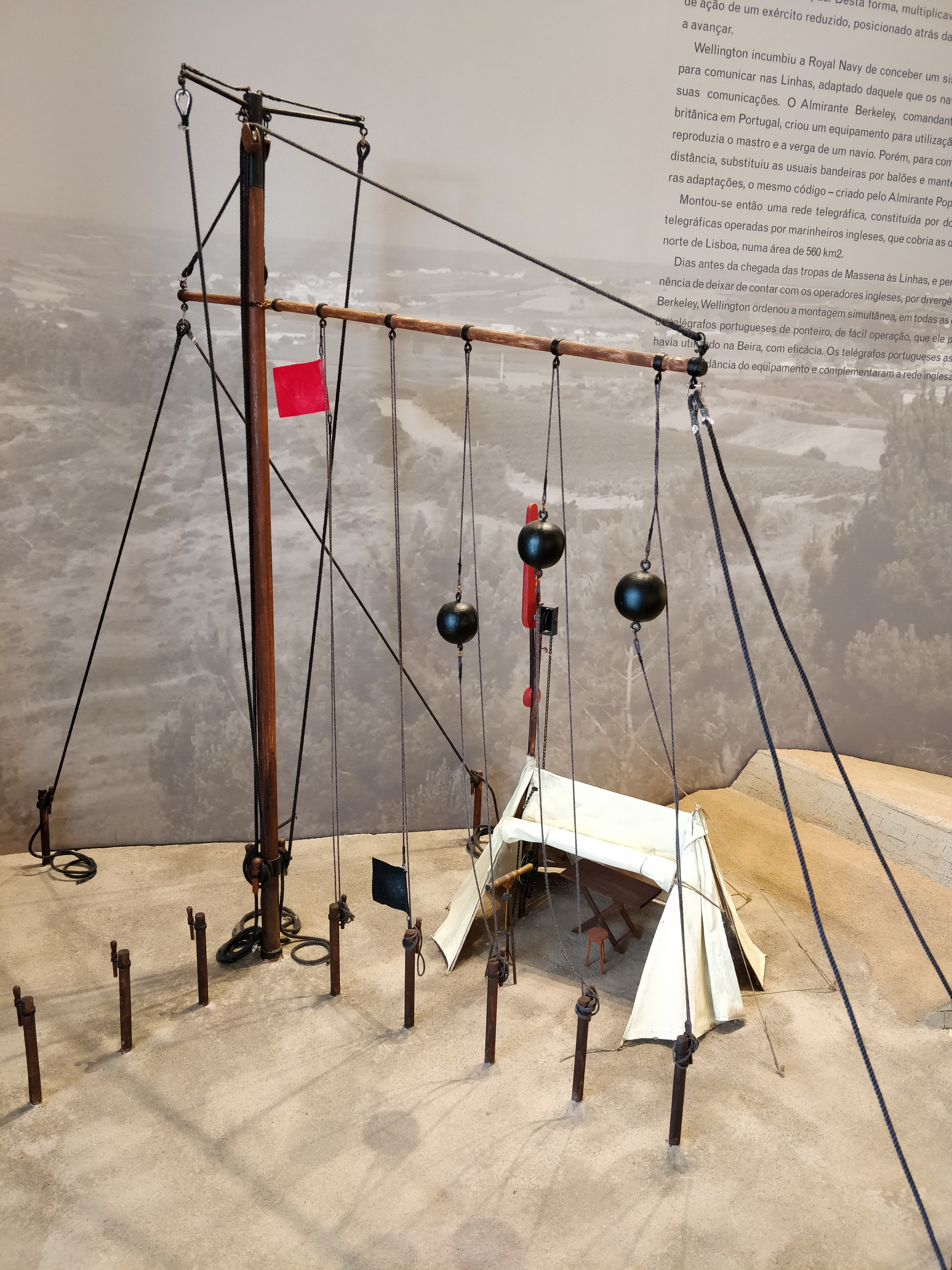
A model of the communications system

The redoubts of the First Line did not require more than 20,000 men to defend them, which left the whole of the true field-army free not only to reinforce any threatened point but also to make counter-attacks. To facilitate such movements a chain of five signal stations was established from one end of the First Line to the other, which allowed a message to be sent along the lines in 7 minutes, or from the HQ to any point in 4 minutes. The signal stations on the First Line were:

- Redoubt n.30 close to the ocean (Ponte do Rol)
- Fort of São Vicente at Torres Vedras
- Monte do Socorro close to Pêro Negro, Wellington's headquarters.
- Monte Agraço
- Sobralinho, by the River Tagus.

while on the Second Line, five stations have been identified at:

- Forts of Serra da Aguieira
- Fort of Sunivel
- Montachique mountain (Cabeço de Montachique)
- Fort of Chipre
- Fort of São Julião at Ericeira

== Memorial ==
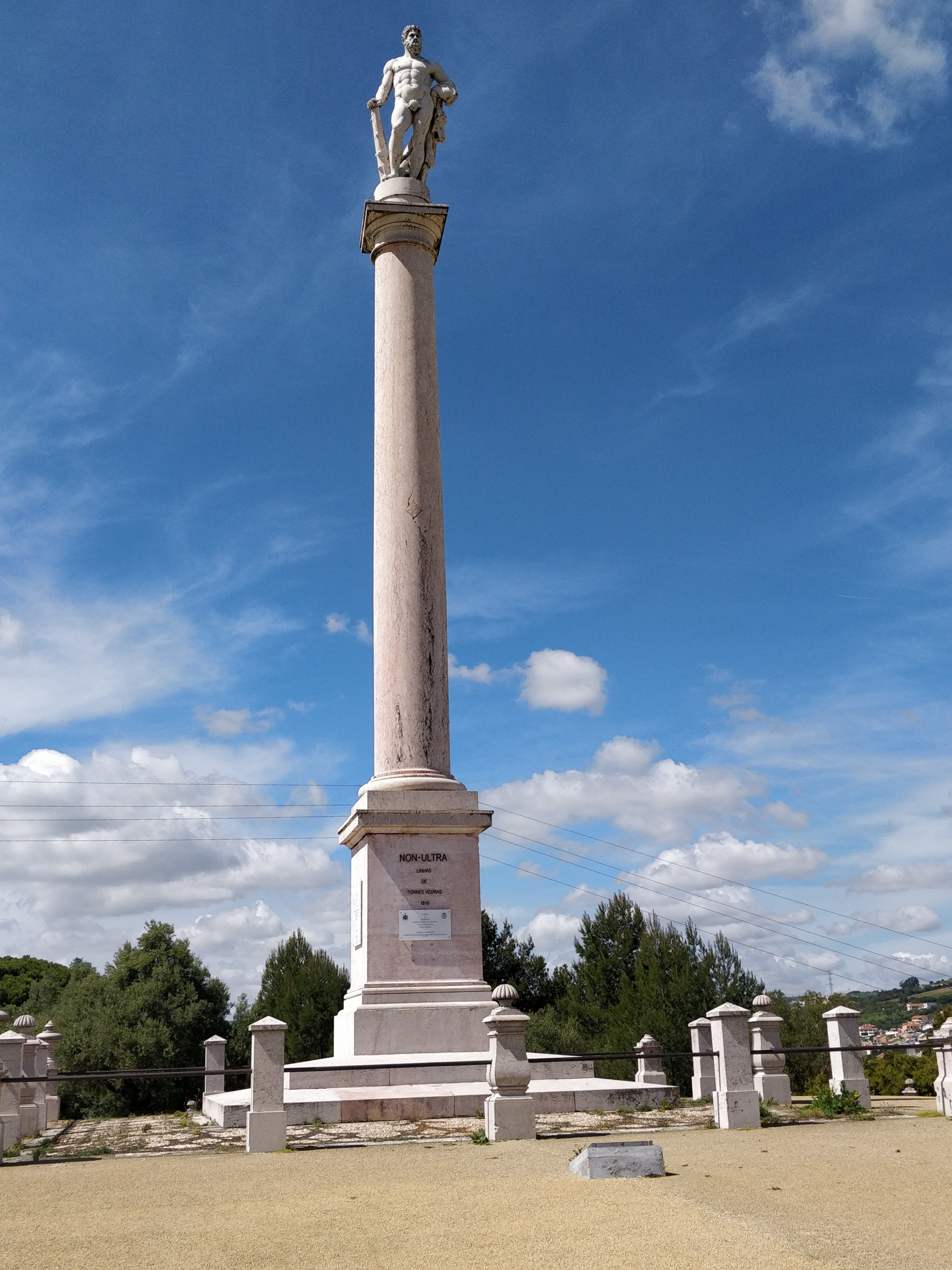
Monument to the Defenders of the Lines of Torres Vedras at Alhandra

A monument commemorating the victory of the Anglo-Portuguese troops over the French armies and the construction of the Torres Vedras Lines was approved in 1874 and finished in 1883. Somewhat reminiscent of Nelson’s Column in London, the column is topped by a statue of the Classical Greek figure of Hercules. This was executed by the sculptor Simões de Almeida who was also responsible for the Monument to the Restorers in Lisbon. The column used marble from the parish of Pêro Pinheiro in Sintra municipality.

The monument was constructed near the village of Alhandra in the municipality of Vila Franca de Xira, on the site of the Boavista redoubt (originally numbered as work Number 3). It is close to work Number 114, the Fort of Subserra (also known as the Fort of Alhandra), which can be visited. In 1911, two plaques were added to acknowledge the contributions of Richard Fletcher and of José Maria das Neves Costa, on whose original topographic maps Wellington based his plans for the Lines.

== Preservation and restoration ==
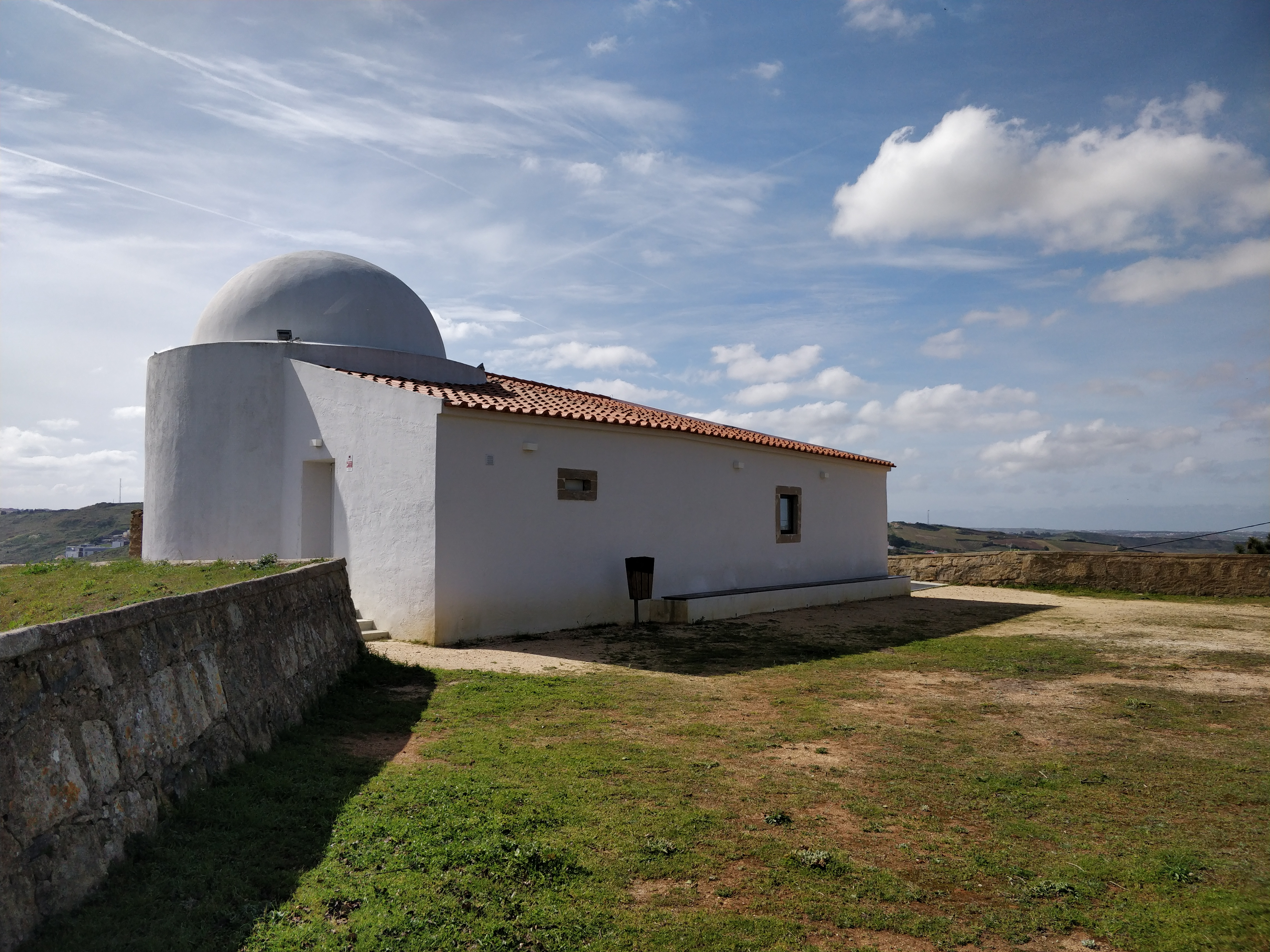
Visitors' Centre at Fort St. Vincent

Substantial portions of the Lines survive today, albeit in most cases in a heavily decayed condition due to past removal of stones. Apart from some limited restoration of Fort St. Vincent in the 1960s the Lines had effectively lain abandoned from the end of the Peninsular War to the beginning of this millennium. In 2001 the six municipalities covered by the Lines (Torres Vedras, Mafra, Sobral de Monte Agraço, Arruda dos Vinhos, Loures and Villa Franca de Xira), together with agencies of what is now the Direção-Geral do Património Cultural (Directorate-General for Cultural Heritage - DGPC), and the Direção dos Serviços de Engenharia (Directorate of Military Engineering) signed a protocol to protect, restore and sustain the Lines. However, initial work was limited due to lack of resources. With the bicentennial of the Lines fast approaching the six municipalities set up an inter-municipal platform to move things forward and decided to apply for funding through the EEA and Norway Grants programme. Funding was granted in 2007.

EEA grants met the costs of 110 projects, while the municipalities funded the work at another 140 sites. Work involved included removal of excess vegetation, creation or restoration of access, archaeological studies, setting up of information boards, establishment of walking routes, and a Visitors' Centre in each municipality. This conservation work was awarded the European Union Prize for Cultural Heritage / Europa Nostra Awards in 2014.

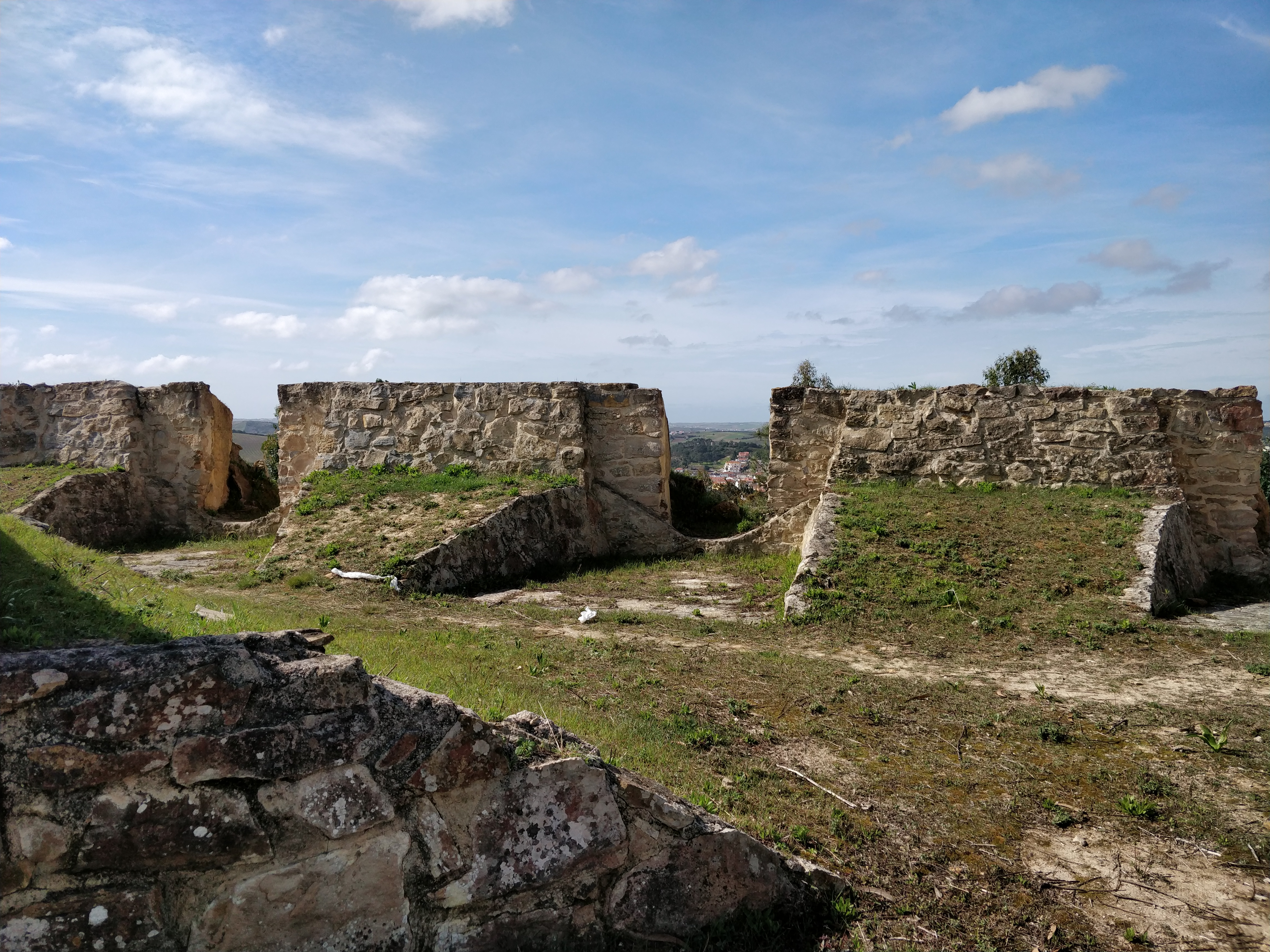
View of gun emplacements at the Fort of Olheiros, Torres Vedras

The Leonel Trindade Municipal Museum, Torres Vedras in the centre of the town has a room dedicated to "The Lines" with a display of information boards and artefacts. A short distance from the museum just outside of the town, Fort of São Vicente and the Fort of Olheiros have been well conserved, with the former having a visitors' centre open Tue-Sun 10-1pm and 2-6pm. The visitors' centre has well-produced historic wall displays and a 20 min video. Other information centres along the lines are:

- Lines of Torres Interpretation Centre at Bucelas Wine museum.
- Fort of Casa
- Interpretation Centre at Sobral de Monte Agraço
- Centro Cultural do Morgado, Arruda dos Vinhos
- Centro de Interpretação das Linhas de Torres de Mafra

=== In fiction ===
- Death to the French, novel by C. S. Forester,
- Sharpe's Gold, novel by Bernard Cornwell
- Sharpe's Escape, novel by Bernard Cornwell
- Lines of Wellington, film by Raúl Ruiz and Valeria Sarmiento
- How the Brigadier Saved An Army, short story by Arthur Conan Doyle
- Beyond the Sunrise, novel by Mary Balogh
- Jonathan Strange & Mr Norrell, novel by Susanna Clarke

== Sources ==
- Bvba, D'Artagnan (2014). "Historical route of the Lines of Torres Vedras". Europa Nostra. Lisbon.
- "Press release – Winners of 2014 EU Prize for Cultural Heritage / Europa Nostra Awards announced". European Commission. 20 March 2014.
- Thompson, Mark S. (2021). Wellington and the Lines of Torres Vedras. Helion. ISBN 978-1-914059-85-8.
- Porter, Major General Whitworth (1889). History of the Corps of Royal Engineers. Vol. I. Chatham: The Institution of Royal Engineers.
- Gates, David (2009). The Spanish Ulcer: A History of Peninsular War. Da Capo Press. pp. 237–238. ISBN 9780786747320.
- Grehan, John (20 January 2016). The Lines of Torres Vedras: The Cornerstone of Wellington's Strategy in the Peninsular War 1809–1812. Spellmount. ISBN 9781473852747.
- Longford, Elizabeth (1972). Wellington: The years of the sword. Vol. 1 (reprint ed.). Harper & Row.
- Pivka, Otto Von; Roffe, Michael (2013). The King's German Legion. Oxford: Osprey Publishing. ISBN 9781472801692.

Attribution:
