= Sobral de Monte Agraço =

- Municipality
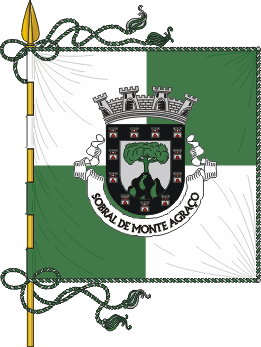
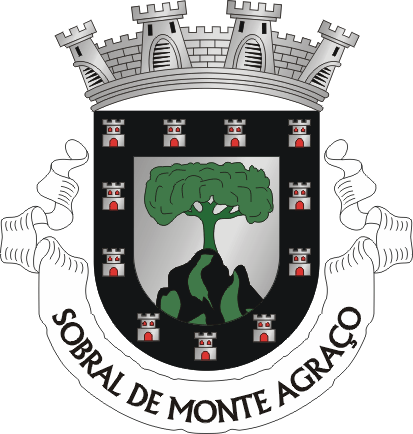
- Flag Coat of arms
- Interactive map of Sobral de Monte Agraço
- Coordinates: 39°01′N 9°09′W
- Country: Portugal
- Region: Oeste e Vale do Tejo
- Intermunic. comm.: Oeste
- District: Lisbon
- Parishes: 3

Government
  - President: António Bogalho (CDU)

Area
  - Total: 52.10 km^{2} (20.12 sq mi)

Population (2011)
  - Total: 10,156
  - Density: 194.9/km^{2} (504.9/sq mi)
- Time zone: UTC+00:00 (WET)
  - Summer (DST): UTC+01:00 (WEST)
- Local holiday: Ascension Day date varies
- Website: www.cm-sobral.pt

Sobral de Monte Agraço (European Portuguese pronunciation: [suˈβɾal dɨ ˈmõt(ɨ) ɐˈɣɾasu]) is a municipality in the historical province of Estremadura and the district of Lisbon, in Portugal. The population in 2011 was 10,156, in an area of 52.10 km^{2}.

The present Mayor is José Alberto Quintino, elected by the Unitary Democratic Coalition.

== History ==
During the Peninsular War, Sobral was on the Lines of Torres Vedras, a line of forts planned by the Duke of Wellington to protect Lisbon. In October 1810, a French army led by André Masséna approached the Lines, finding that the Portuguese had subjected the area in front of them to a scorched earth policy. After the minor Battle of Sobral on 14 October, the French found they could go no further. Charles Oman writes "On that misty October 14th morning, at Sobral, the Napoleonic tide attained its highest watermark."

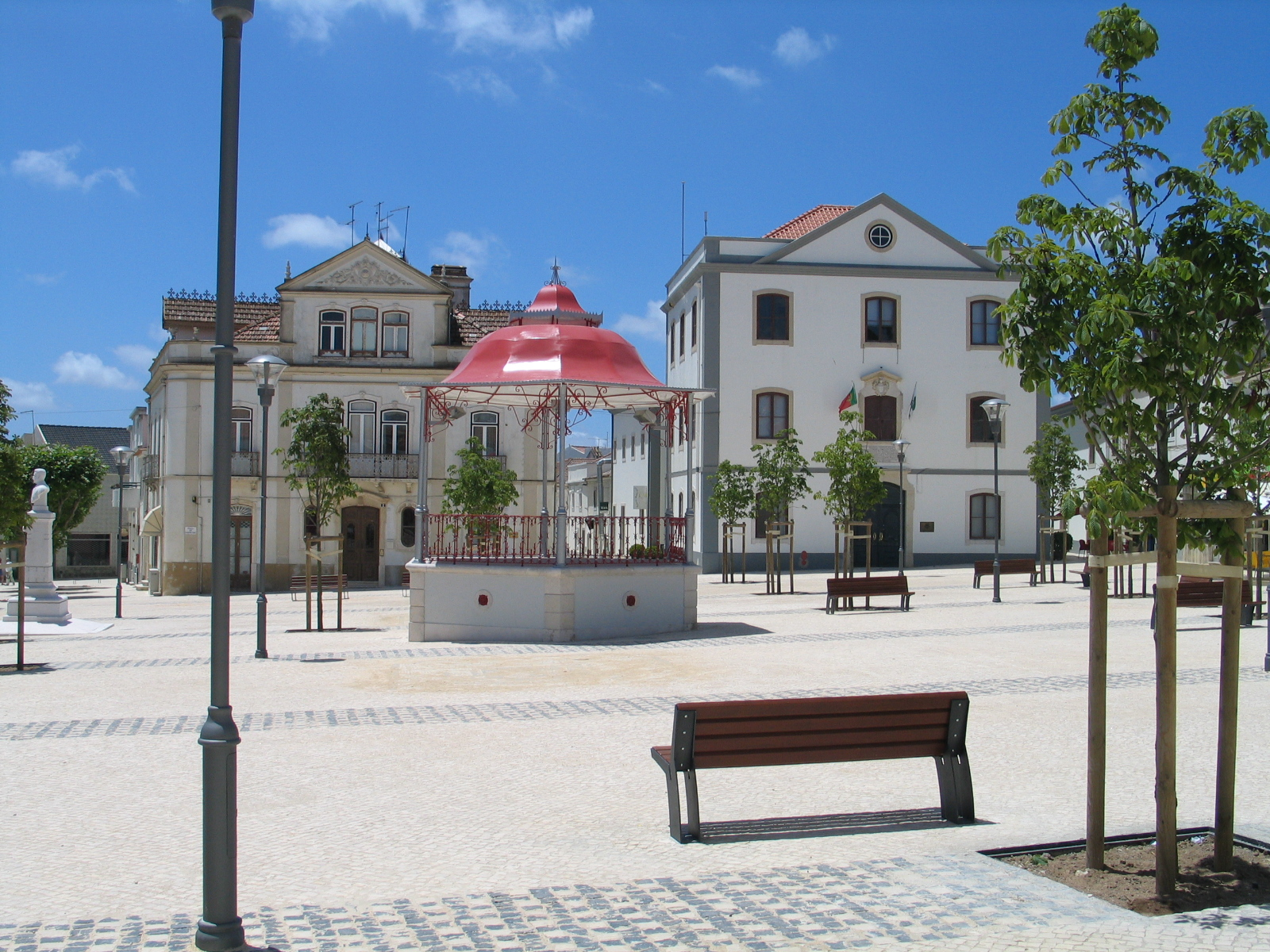
Sobral de Monte Agraço main square

== Monuments ==
- St. Salvador Chapel - 13th century Romanesque style
- Sobral Main Church - 16th century Renaissance style
- São Quintino Church - 16th-17th century Manueline and Renaissance styles
- Our Lady of Purification Church - 16th century Renaissance style
- Town Hall and ancient jail - 18th century
- Fort of Alqueidão - 19th century
- Cine-Theater - 20th century Art Deco style

== Parishes ==
Administratively, the municipality is divided into 3 civil parishes (freguesias):

- São Quintino
- Sapataria
- Sobral de Monte Agraço

== Notable people ==
- José António Freire Sobral (1840 in São Quintino – 1905), a rich farmer and a large exporter of coffee, cocoa and woods who made his fortune in São Tomé Island in Portuguese São Tomé and Príncipe.
- Fábio Silvestre (born 1990 in Sobral de Monte Agraço) a Portuguese former cyclist
