= Brent Spencer =

British Army general

General Sir Brent Spencer GCB
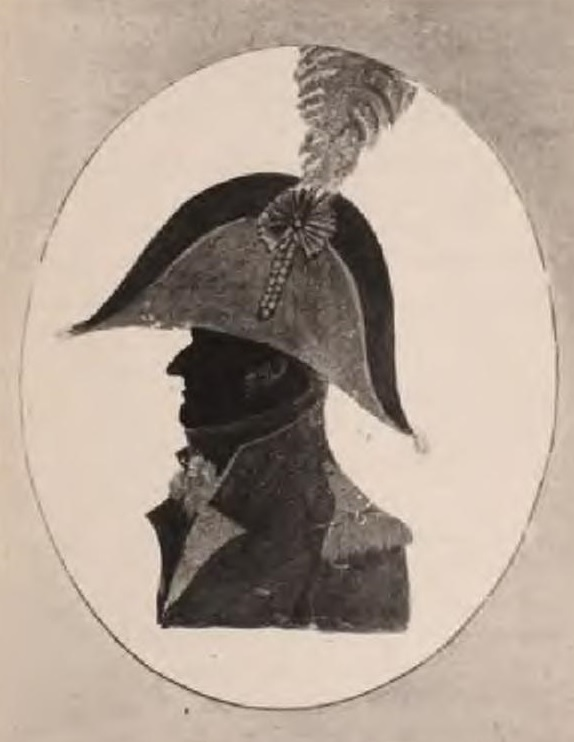
- The only known portrait of Spencer

Member of Parliament for Sligo
- In office 27 March 1815 – 1818
- Preceded by: Joshua Spencer
- Succeeded by: John Bent

Personal details
- Born: 1760
- Died: 29 December 1828 (aged 67–68)

Military service
- Allegiance: United Kingdom
- Branch/service: British Army
- Years of service: 1778–1828
- Commands: 103rd Regiment of Foot; 40th (the 2nd Somersetshire) Regiment of Foot; 2nd West India Regiment; 95th Regiment of Foot; Rifle Brigade 1st Battalion; 40th (2nd Somersetshire) Regiment of Foot
- Battles/wars: American Revolutionary War; French Revolutionary Wars; War of the First Coalition; War of the Second Coalition; Anglo-Russian invasion of Holland; Battle of Alexandria; Napoleonic Wars; Battle of Copenhagen; Peninsular War; Battle of Vimeiro; Battle of Bussaco; Battle of Fuentes de Oñoro; Second Siege of Badajoz

General Sir Brent Spencer GCB (c. 1760 – 29 December 1828) was an Anglo-Irish officer in the British Army, seeing active service during the American Revolutionary War and the French Revolutionary Wars. During the Peninsular War he became General Wellesley's second-in-command on two occasions. He fought at Vimeiro and testified in Wellesley's favour at the inquiry following the Convention of Cintra. He led a division at Bussaco and two divisions at Fuentes de Onoro. After the latter action, he had an independent command in northern Portugal. Wellesley, now Lord Wellington, was not satisfied that Spencer was up to the responsibilities of second-in-command and he was replaced by Thomas Graham. Miffed, Spencer left Portugal and never returned. He became a full general in 1825.

He was the Member of Parliament (MP) for Sligo from 1815 to 1818.

== Early life and family ==
Spencer was born circa 1760, the second son of Conway Spencer of Trumery and his wife, Mary. His brother was politician Joshua Spencer, and their nephew was George Canning, 1st Baron Garvagh (who married Lady Georgiana Stewart, daughter of the 1st Marquess of Londonderry).

== Early career ==
Spencer became a commissioned officer in 1778. He fought with great credit in the West Indies in 1779–1782 during the American Revolutionary War and again in 1790–1794 during the War of the First Coalition. Promoted to brigadier general, he participated in the unsuccessful 1797 Santo Domingo campaign against Toussaint Louverture. In 1799, he led the 40th Foot during the Anglo-Russian invasion of Holland. This campaign included the battles of Bergen and Castricum.

In 1801, Spencer served with General Sir Ralph Abercromby's army in Egypt at the Battle of Alexandria. He fought in the Copenhagen campaign in late 1807.

== The Peninsula ==
The Dos de Mayo Uprising of Spain against Napoleon found Spencer in command at Gibraltar. On his own initiative he sailed for Portugal and arrived at Mondego Bay on 5 August 1808. The force that he brought with him were 946 men of the 6th Foot, 806 soldiers of the 29th Foot, 874 troops of the 32nd Foot, 948 men of the 50th Foot, 929 soldiers of the 82nd Foot, and 245 artillerists. All infantry units consisted of 1st Battalions, except the 29th which was not organized into battalions. At Mondego Bay he joined his force to the 8,123 troops that General Arthur Wellesley brought from Cork in Ireland.

At the Battle of Vimeiro in 1808, Spencer was Wellesley's second-in-command. He was made a Knight Companion of the Order of the Bath on 26 April 1809. He commanded the 1st Division at the Battle of Bussaco and in the 1810-1811 French invasion of Portugal. At the Battle of Fuentes de Onoro in 1811, Spencer, now a lieutenant-general, temporarily led both the 1st and 3rd Divisions.

After Fuentes, Wellington went south to participate in the Siege of Badajoz. He left Spencer and 28,000 Anglo-Portuguese to defend the province of Beira in the north.

Later that year, he was replaced by Thomas Graham, 1st Baron Lynedoch because of pessimistic letters which he had sent back to England. In 1825, Spencer was promoted to full general.

Wellington wrote of Spencer, "He was exceedingly puzzle headed. He would talk of the Thames for the Tagus."

== Later career ==
After having been in succession Colonel of the 9th Garrison Battalion (1806–08) and the 2nd West India Regiment (1808–09) and Colonel-Commandant of the 2nd Battalion of the 95th Regiment of Foot (1809–16) and the 1st Battalion of the Rifle Brigade (1816–18), in 1818 he was given the colonelcy of the 40th (2nd Somersetshire) Regiment of Foot, which he held until his death in 1828.

== Romance with Princess Augusta ==
Spencer met Princess Augusta Sophia, the second daughter of King George III and Charlotte of Mecklenburg-Strelitz, about 1800, and a romantic friendship had developed by about 1803.

In 1805, Spencer was appointed as an equerry to the king. According to Augusta, the couple conducted their relationship with great discretion as they were not of equal rank. News of such an attachment was feared to disturb the King's precarious mental health.

In 1812, Augusta sent a long letter to her brother the Prince Regent to ask for his consent to her marrying Spencer, but it is unknown whether she did so. It is believed the couple remained together until Spencer's death in 1828.

== Notes ==
Parliament of the United Kingdom
Preceded by Joshua Spencer	Member of Parliament for Sligo; 27 March 1815 – 1818	Succeeded by John Bent
Military offices
New regiment	Colonel of the 103rd Regiment of Foot; 1806–1808	Succeeded by Samuel Auchmuty
Preceded by Eyre Power Trench	Colonel of the 2nd West India Regiment; 1808–1809	Succeeded by Sir George Beckwith
New regiment	Colonel-Commandant of the 2nd Battalion, 95th Regiment of Foot; 1809–1816	Succeeded by Sir William Stewart
Preceded by Forbes Champagné	Colonel-Commandant of the 1st Battalion, Rifle Brigade; 1816–1818	Succeeded by Sir William Stewart
Preceded by Sir George Osborn	Colonel of the 40th Regiment of Foot; 1818–1829	Succeeded by Sir James Kempt
