= Castro of Vila Nova de São Pedro =

- Castro de Vila Nova de São Pedro
- Location within Portugal

General information
- Type: Castro
- Architectural style: Chalcolithic
- Location: Vila Nova de São Pedro, Azambuja, Portugal
- Coordinates: 39°13′11.16″N 8°50′25.33″W
- Opened: 2700 BCE
- Owner: Portuguese Republic

Technical details
- Material: Limestone

The Castro of Vila Nova de São Pedro is a Chalcolithic archaeological site in the civil parish of Vila Nova de São Pedro, municipality of Azambuja, in the Portuguese Estremadura area of Lezíria do Tejo. It is important for the discovery of thousands of arrowheads within its fortified settlement, associated with the Chalcolithic period of human settlement, and in particular with the long-lived fortified town, or castro, of Zambujal, near the municipality of Torres Vedras. This period of "urban" settlement lasted from 2600 to 1300 BCE, and during this time the Castro of Vila Nova was a contemporary of the southeastern Spanish settlements of Los Millares and El Argar.

== Architecture ==
The rural site, is located on a small hilltop dominated by the ruins of a castle, and intersected in the north, east and west by the Ribeira de Alcoentre, Ribeira do Carrascal and Ribeira do Massuca (respectively).

The castro settlement was built during two phases: initially (associated with the Vila Nova de São Pedro I or VNSP I culture), an open settlement; followed by a fortified settlement (VNSP 2) encircled by wall of rocks (covered in clay). Within its perimeter are the vestiges of a semi-circular domed oven/kiln, alongside a limestone space and cistern. Many of these pre-existing structures were dismantled and/or destroyed during a phase of settlement (VNSP III), followed by a fourth period of occupation which resulted in another phase of destruction (VNSP IV), leading to the construction of a new system of defense.

The oven and ancillary space (where was discovered full of pottery from the VSNP 2 era) constitutes a group associated with the industrial fabrication of ceramics, receiving water from the cistern for its operation. These structures were destroyed and substituted for new spaces (VNSP III) when the spaces were expropriated for the metallurgic manufacture of copper, spinning and weaving, and the manufacture of dairy products, etc.

== History ==
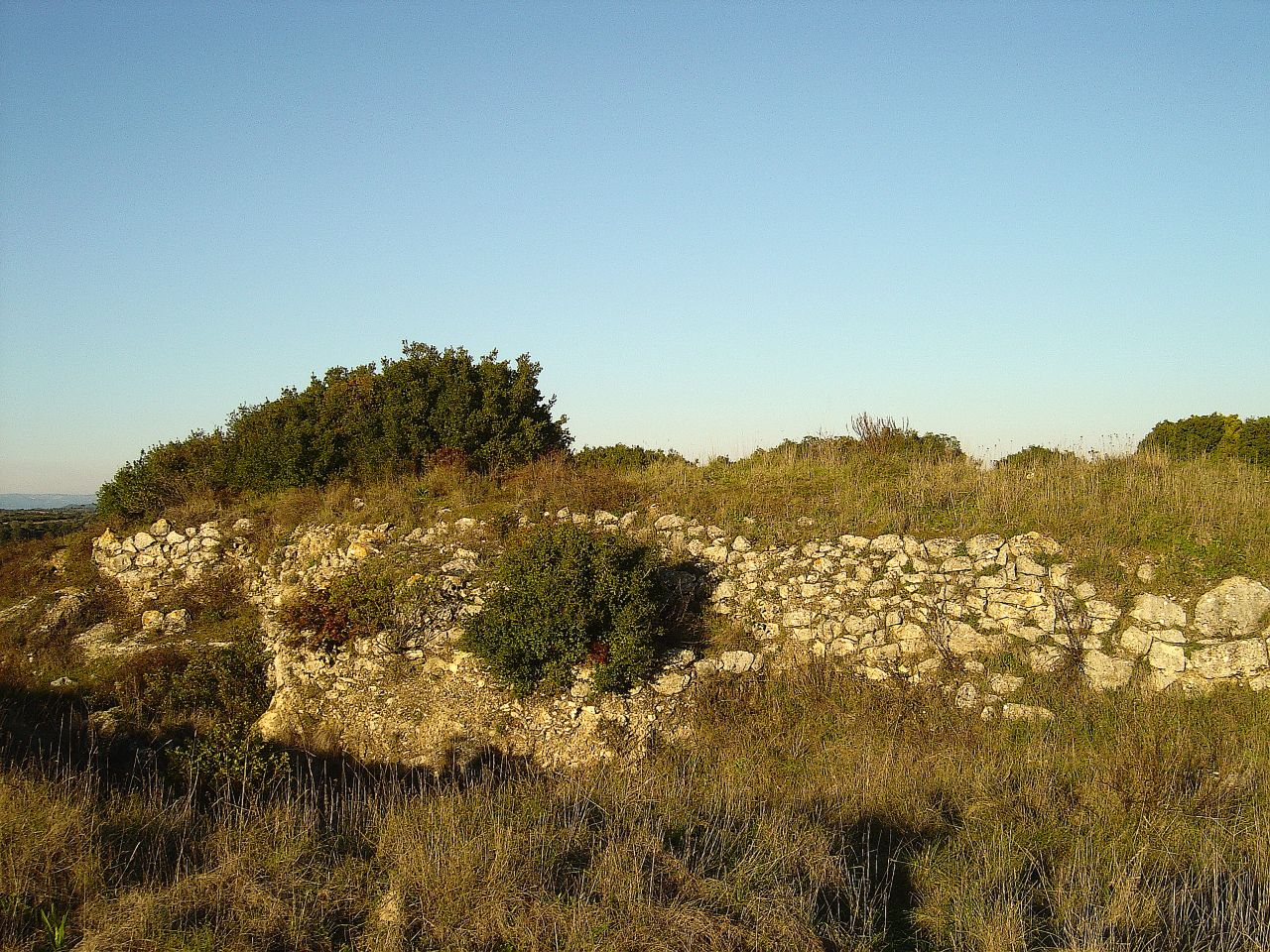
Stone ruins of the Castro de Vila Nova de São Pedro

The southwestern region of the Iberian Peninsula is a focus of Megalithism, predating by 1000 years the megalithic region of western France: The erection of dolmens, menhirs and castros developed over a long period of southern and central Portugal. At about the beginning of the 3rd millennium BCE, contemporaneous with metallurgy associated with the copper and precious metals, new types of tomb-building appeared in the western Mediterranean regions. There has been some debate as to whether these developments originated in the Eastern Mediterranean or whether they are independent of these cultures, although there is little evidence to support the hypothesis, other than the use of the term tholoi (which can be seen as a more contemporaneous development).

=== VNSP I ===
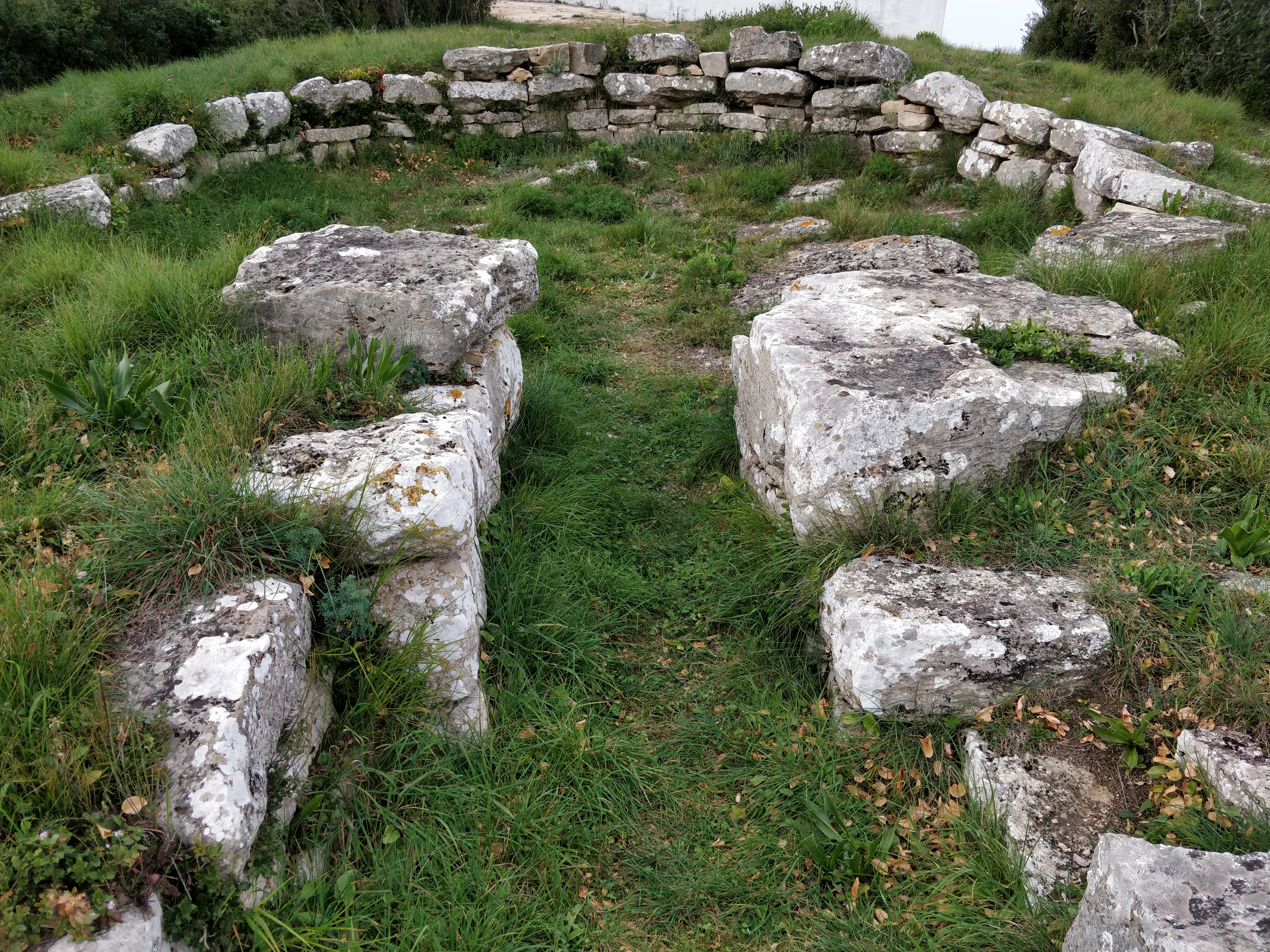
Tholos do Barro

It has been determined that early inhabitants in this region began building fortifications around 2700 BCE, with the Dolmen of Herdade de Zambujal being the more central, with a very complex plan and up to six reconstructions in its lifetime. These cultures left behind many traces of their culture: stylized cups, crescents of clay, sticks of slate and the so-called plate-idols, that some archaeo-astronomers consider to be precise calendars. Nevertheless, the exchange with other groups, particularly Los Millares, is also present in the archaeological record. The inhabitants of the fort had its economy based on agriculture and grazing, which was suitable to the surrounding lowlands.

=== VNSP II ===
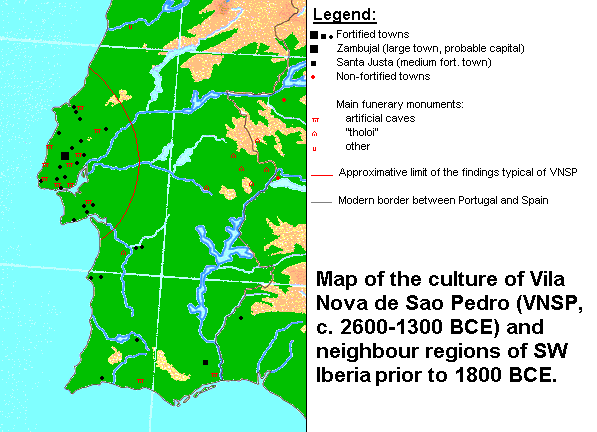

But, trade proved to have greater interest: the first settlers brought with them red-tinged pottery, more delicate than later ceramics, with excellent decoration, suggesting their contact with peoples of a superior civilization (something that they could not produce with similar quality). With the arrival of the Beaker peoples around 2200 BCE, the local culture entered a new period of development that mixed the Beaker people burial rites, while maintaining other traditions. It is likely that the Beaker people's presence within this region also resulted in secondary phase of development of this culture. The inter-cultural exchanges between groups were more frequent, and their influence spread to distances of 1000 kilometres or greater, as was the case with the Treilles, in the French Languedoc. Local artifacts associated with these cultures, such as the Palmela arrowheads or bell-shaped beakers, were commonly found dispersed in the western half of the Iberian peninsula, suggesting an origin in the region. After 1900 BCE there is a decentralization in the Iberian peninsula, resulting in a dispersion of many of these artifacts to as far as Bohemia.

With the arrival of Bronze Age technologies in southern Iberia after 1800 BCE (particularly in El Argar), the influence of the castro culture of Vila Nova de São Pedro begins to slowly decline. Finally, around 1300, it merges with the wider culture associated with internally burnished pottery, including most of Portugal and the wider Atlantic Bronze Age cultures.

== Excavations ==
The site was discovered in 1936 by Raposo, and followed in 1937 by excavations under the auspices of the Associação dos Arqueólogos Portugueses (Association of Portuguese Archaeologists). Between 1941 and 1948, 1949–1954, 1959 and 1960–1967, Afonso do Paço was responsible for the dig.

In 1961, the Direcção Geral dos Edifícios e Monumentos Nacionais (DGMEN) (General Directorate for Buildings and National Monuments) also conducted investigations, in conjunction with the Serviços de Monumentos Nacionais (National Monument Services branch).

Following the authorization of Vitor Manuel dos Santos Gonçalves, in 1985, new archaeological investigations were undertaken at the site.

== Gallery ==
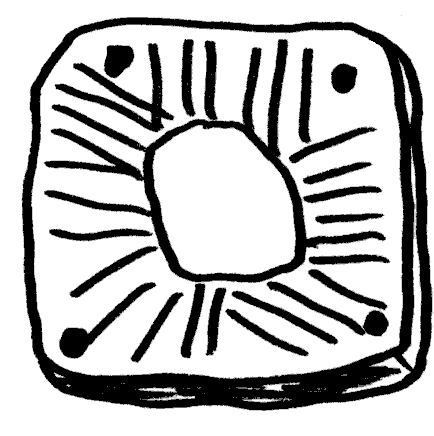
Reproduction of a sun-like carving from the castro

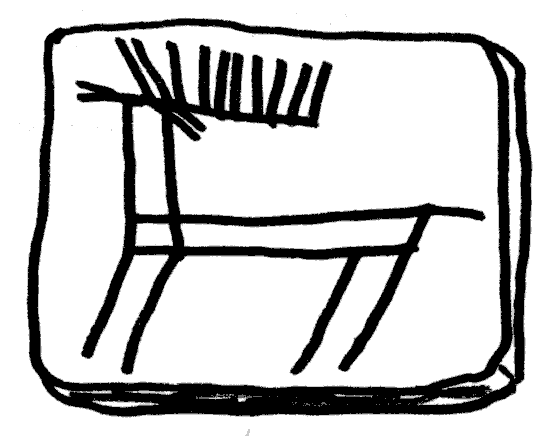
Reproduction of a deer carving discovered in the Castro

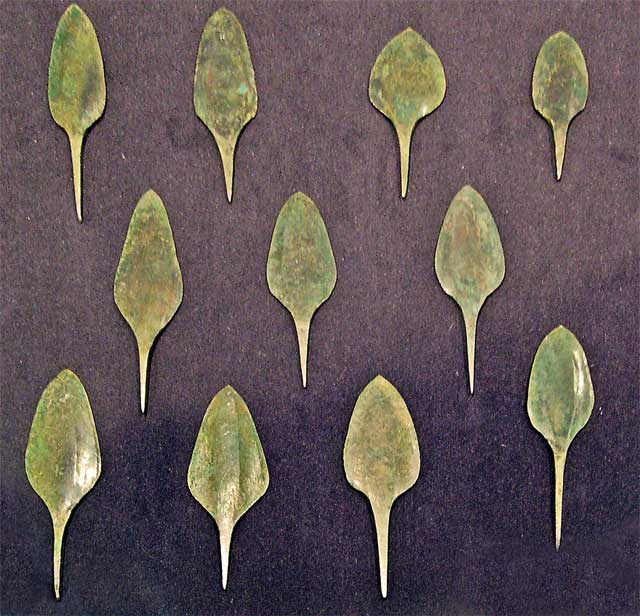
Palmela-style arrow points produced in the region influenced by the VNSP

== See also ==
- Bell Beaker culture
- Castro of Zambujal
- Castelo Velho de Freixo de Numão
- Los Millares
- Valencina de la Concepción
- El Argar
- European Megalithic Culture
- Megalith
- Neolithic Europe
- Prehistoric Iberia
- South-Western Iberian Bronze
