= Gundisalvus of Lagos =

Portuguese Roman Catholic priest

Blessed Gundisalvus of Lagos O.E.S.A.
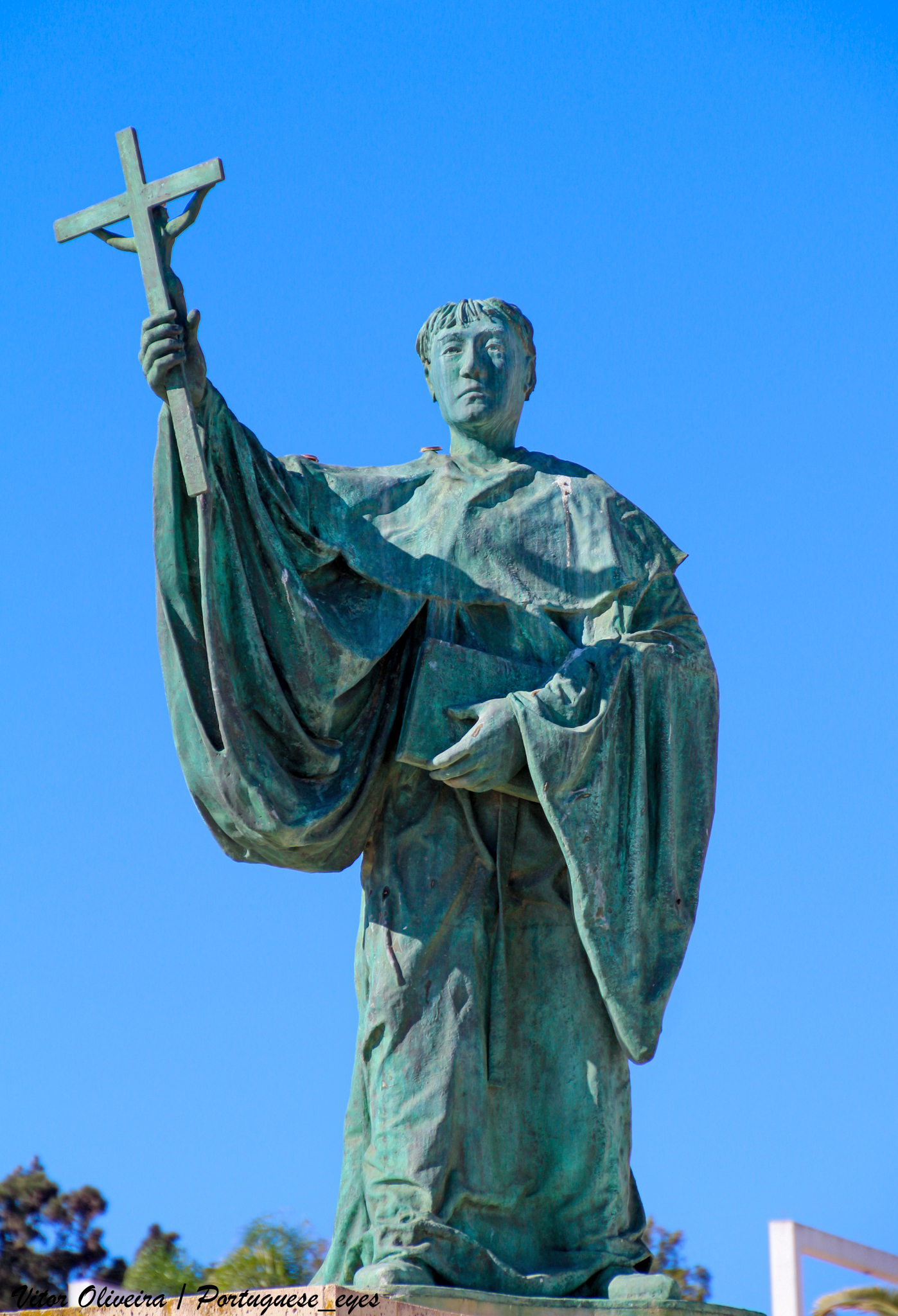
- Statue of Gundisalvus in Lagos

Priest
- Born: c. 1360; Lagos, Algarve, Portugal
- Died: 15 October 1422 (aged 61–62); Convent of Our Lady of Grace, Torres Vedras, Portugal
- Venerated in: Roman Catholic Church
- Beatified: 27 May 1778 by Pope Pius VI
- Feast: 15 October
- Patronage: Torres Vedras; Lagos

Gundisalvus of Lagos, O.E.S.A. (Portuguese: Gonçalo de Lagos; c. 1360 – 15 October 1422) was a Portuguese Catholic priest and Augustinian friar.

Gundisalvus was the prior of several Augustinian houses, among them the important Convent of Our Lady of Grace in Lisbon (the seat of the Augustinians' Province of Portugal). He was a theologian and preacher of some repute, who concentrated his catechetical work on children, as well as the illiterate and the uneducated. A gifted scribe and artist, he was also known to have illuminated liturgical books and to have composed plainsong pieces.

== Life ==
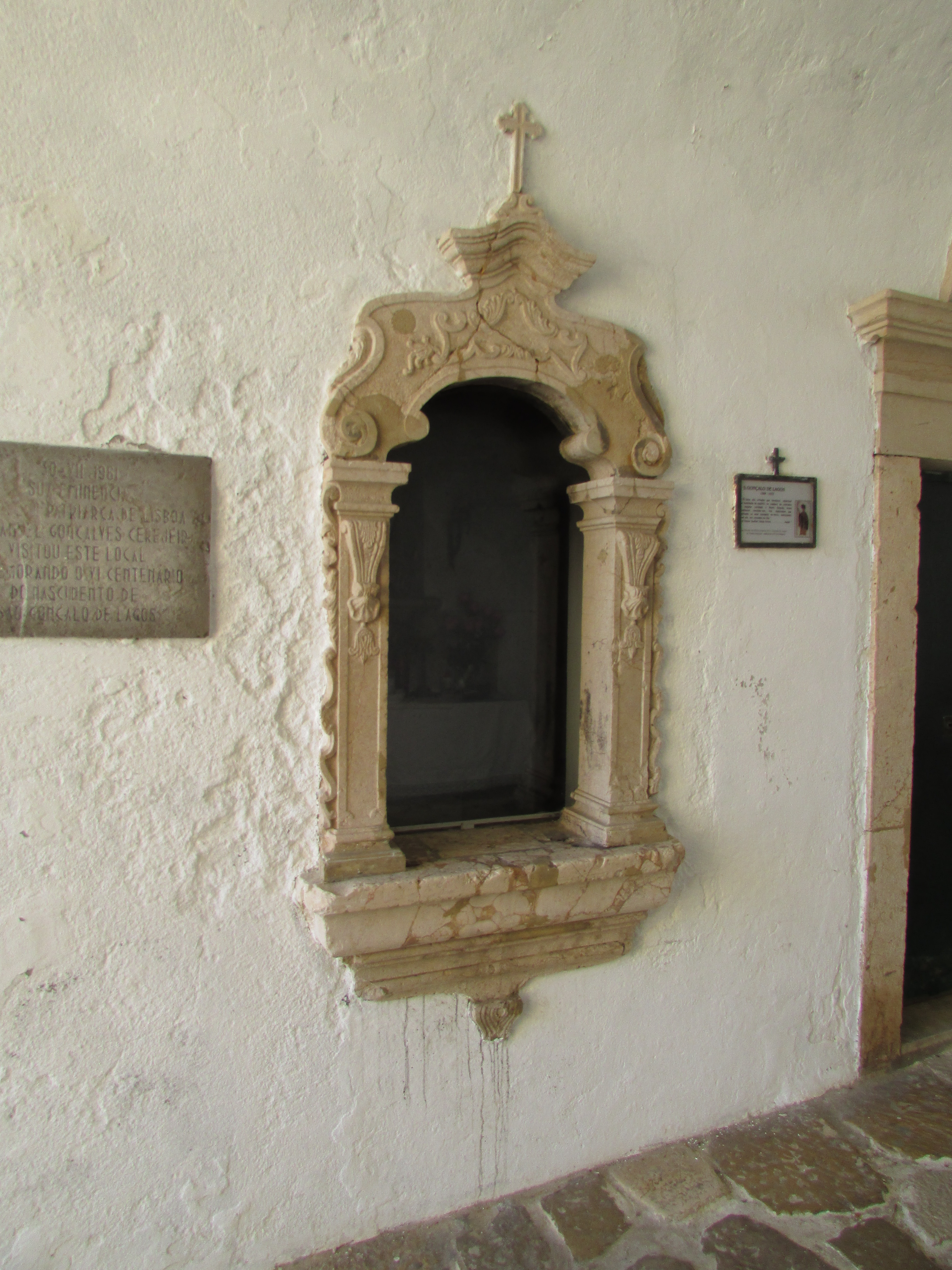
Shrine to Blessed Gundisalvus in the place where he is traditionally said to have been born, near one of gates of the old city walls of Lagos (Porta de São Gonçalo)

Gundisalvus was of humble origin, born in the city of Lagos, in the Algarve, in an uncertain date around 1360. Having shown a vocation for religious life from an early age, he joined the Order of Hermits of Saint Augustine at the Convent of Our Lady of Grace in Lisbon c. 1380, at around age 20.

By 1394, he was the prior of the Convent of Saint Lawrence in Miragaia, Lourinhã; by 1404 he was the superior of the important Convent of Our Lady of Grace in Lisbon, and by 1408 he was governing the Convent of Our Lady of Grace in Santarém, Portugal. From 1412 and until his death in 1422, he was the prior of the Convent of Our Lady of Grace in Torres Vedras. As a superior, he was known to perform menial jobs in a conscious effort to humble himself in imitation of Christ.

His relics remain interred in the church of the former Augustinian convent in Torres Vedras.

== Legacy ==
The earliest hagiographic works about Gundisalvus of Lagos are a set of three texts written between the late 15th century and the 17th century, by João de França de Brito, Frei Aleixo de Menezes (1559–1617), and Frei António da Purificação (1601–1658). His reputation for sanctity shortly after his death is evidenced by the fact that the city of Torres Vedras named him as its "Defender and Patron" as early as 1495, and the same was done by the city of Lagos a couple of years later.

In the 18th century, after a period of some decadence within the Portuguese Augustinian province, there was a renewed interest in the figure of Gundisalvus of Lagos and efforts began for his cultus to achieve pontifical recognition. On 2 August 1759, Frei Francisco Xavier Vasques, the Augustinian provincial, formally requested the Cardinal-Patriarch of Lisbon, Francisco de Saldanha da Gama, to open the cause for his canonisation: he was beatified on 27 May 1778 by Pope Pius VI. Despite his common epithet of "saint" (São Gonçalo de Lagos), he was never formally canonised.

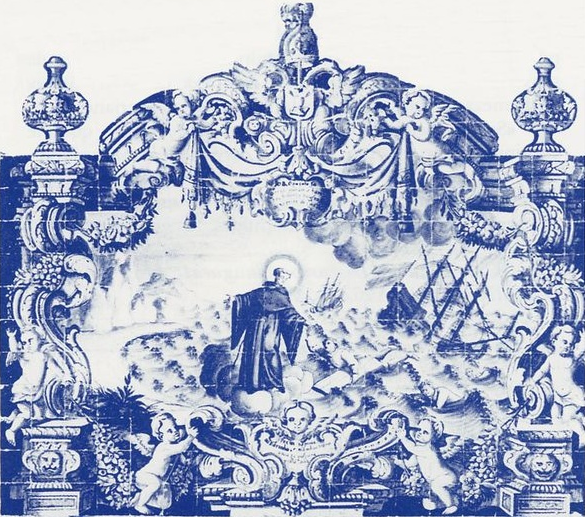
18th-century azulejo panel in the Convent of Our Lady of Grace in Torres Vedras showing Blessed Gundisalvus saving his nephew from a shipwreck

Gundisalvus is often invoked as a protector of mariners. He is credited with having, 15 years after his death, miraculously appeared to a nephew of his, saving him from a shipwreck while en route to Lisbon. For this reason, he is often represented holding a book on one hand and blessing the sea with the crucifix he holds on the other.

A bronze statue of Gundisalvus by sculptor Tolentino Abegoaria was erected by public subscription in 2001 in his birthplace of Lagos, on a viewpoint overlooking Praia da Batata.
