= South-Western Iberian Bronze =

Bronze Age culture in Portugal

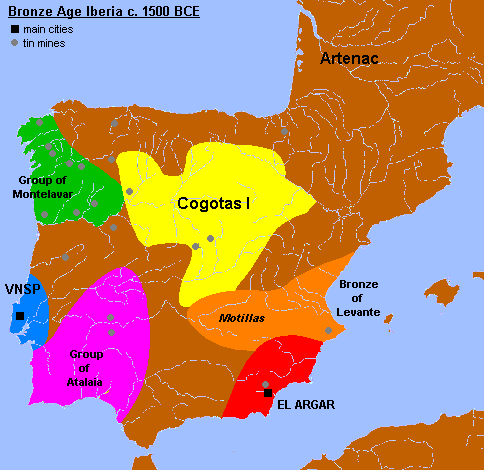
The Horizon of Atalaia was the apogee of this culture.

The South-Western Iberian Bronze is a loosely defined Bronze Age culture of Southern Portugal and nearby areas of SW Spain (Huelva, Seville, Extremadura). It replaced the earlier urban and Megalithic existing in that same region in the Chalcolithic age.

It is characterized by individual burials in cist, in which the deceased is accompanied by a knife of bronze. Stelae with representations of types of weapons and other warriors' accoutrements are associated with these burials. Much more rare but also more impressive are the 'grabsystem' tombs, made up of three adjacent stone enclosures, of quasi-circular form, each one with an opening. They are covered by tumuli and are possibly the burials of the main leaders of these peoples.

== Phases ==
1. Horizon of Ferradeira (c. 1900–1500 BCE): still mostly Chalcolithic but already with individual burials. Influenced by the culture of Vila Nova de São Pedro.
2. Horizon of Atalaia (c. 1500–1100 BCE): that introduces the grabsystem tombs, being contemporary of El Argar B but continuing after its end. It is in this phase when the culture extends to Extremadura and Western Andalusia. From 17th to 13th centuries BC (c. 1600-c. 1300 BC), Middle Bronze Age 'Alentejo' stelae (Alentejanas) with representations of types of weapons and other warriors' accoutrements were erected mainly in south Portugal. The burials associated with these Alentejanas often have a circular or sub-circular pavement at the surface with the burial in a stone cist cut through the middle.
3. Horizon of Santa Vitória (c. 1100-700 BCE): that reaches the early Iron Age. Imitations of early Urnfield rilled-ware vessels are found in Late Bronze Age burials in southern Portugal, for example, lovely funerary pottery urns at Santa Vitória in Beja Municipality. The nearest parallels to these pottery designs are found in west-central France. In particular, there is evidence of contact exposure to the Bronze D (Bz D) rilled-ware province of the Paris basin and the north-west Alpine foreland, and to a lesser extent also to the Rhine-Swiss-French (RSF) group of Hallstatt A (Ha A). Early radiocarbon dates for the first Celts in the southwest of the Iberian peninsula of around 800 BC at Segovia just north of Elvas in Portugal to the north-north-east of Beja and of around 700 BC at Faro to the south, but within this cultural area, support this association. Approximately 130 Late Bronze Age (LBA) 'warrior' stelae ranging from c. 1300 to c. 800 BC are found in the South-West of the Iberian peninsula. Early Western Urnfield Group C1 crested helmets are depicted on some of these LBA stelae, for example at Valencia de Alcantara and Santa Ana de Trujillo. There are examples of stones with both images of human figures and elements of the warrior panoply (shields, spears, swords, helmets, chariots, brooches, mirrors, combs, lyres, etc.) together with Southwestern (SW) writing in the Tartessian language. The warrior stelae of Capote with inscription J.54.1 and Cabeza del Buey IV with inscription Majada Honda, J.110 are examples of stelae with such writing.

== Burials ==
The use of collective burial megaliths and artificial caves fade in the region around the last quarter of the III millennium, then two new burial types appear: the tholoi and the cists (buried rocky boxes), usually placed inside a stone circle. All these funerary customs end in the Final Bronze Age (with few possible exceptions like Nora Velha and Roça do Casal do Meio): the new incineration rite prevails over inhumation, and the new necropolises are formed with rectangular or squared plain tumuli made of stones.

== Genetic profile ==
Three buried males were tested from the archaeological sites Monte do Gato de Cima 3 and Torre Velha 3 (being dated to the second quarter of the second millennium BC); one had Y-chromosome haplogroup R1b1a2, and the other two the derived subclade R1b1a2a1a2 (R-P312). The autosomal components were ~55% Anatolian farmer, ~45% Western hunter-gatherer. In another genetic article, it was determined that an individual from Monte da Cabida 3 site (São Manços, Évora), dated to the period 2200-1700 BC, had Y-DNA R1b-L51.

== Related cultures ==
- Castro of Vila Nova de São Pedro
- Bell Beaker culture
- Urnfield culture

== See also ==
- Prehistoric Iberia
- Neolithic Europe
- Chalcolithic
- Megalith
- European Megalithic culture
- Beaker People
- Los Millares
- El Argar
- Hallstatt culture
- Celts
