= Castro of Zambujal =

Neolithic site in Portugal

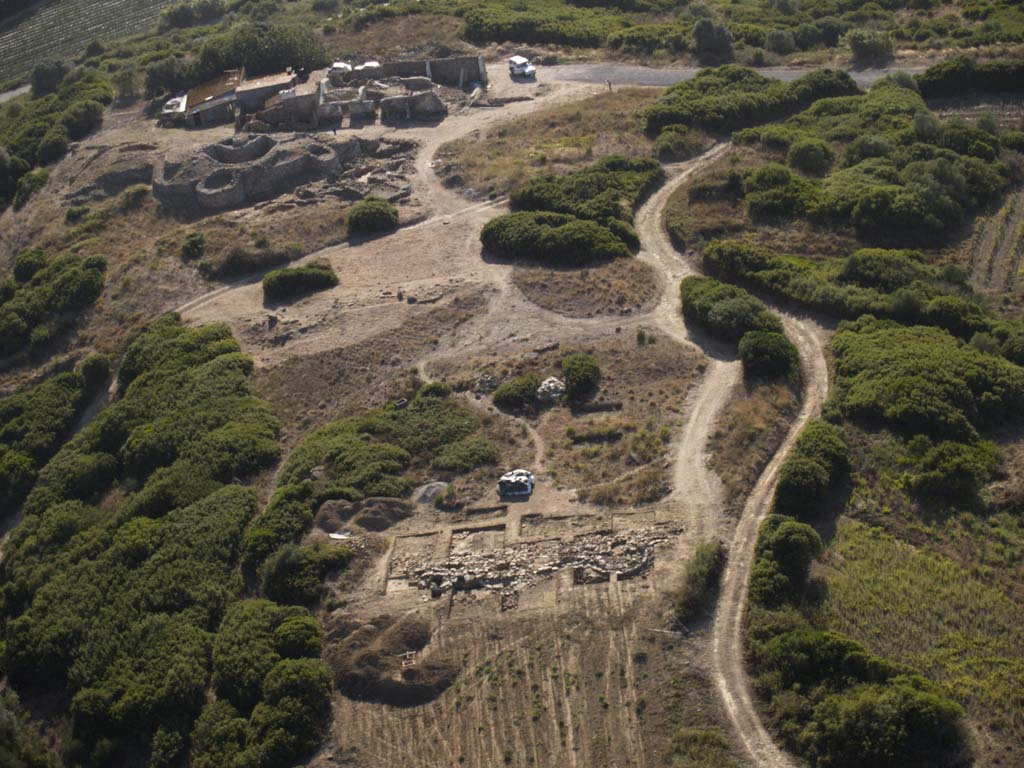
- The excavations on the Zambujal promontory in 2007, showing in front the 4th fortification line
- Interactive map of Castro of Zambujal
- 39°4′27.78″N 9°17′8.20″W
- Type: Settlement
- Location: Lisbon, Portugal

History
- Built: c. 3000 BC
- Abandoned: c. 1700 BC
- Discovered: 1932 by Leonel Trindade

The Castro of Zambujal (Portuguese: Castro do Zambujal) is a Chalcolithic age archeological site in the municipality of Torres Vedras in the western litoral area of the Centro Region, Portugal. The Zambujal Castro is one of the most important Copper Age settlements in the peninsula of Lisbon, and whose culture lasted until the beginning of the agrarian periods of Iberian history. Apart from being the most northerly discovered Copper Age site in Portugal, it went through two main building phases: an import-oriented phase and the second associated with the Beaker culture.

Most of the artefacts discovered at the site are stored and displayed in the Leonel Trindade Municipal Museum, Torres Vedras.

== Excavations ==
The site was discovered and interpreted in 1932 by the Portuguese archaeologist Leonel Trindade, who made the first investigation in 1944 and, together with Aurélio Ricardo Belo, from 1959 to 1961.

From 1964 until the present, excavations have mainly been financed by the German Archaeological Institute of Madrid. Excavations from 1964 to 1973 were directed by Hermanfrid Schubart (German Archaeological Institute) and Edward Sangmeister (University of Freiburg). From 1994 to 1995, new work at the site was started by Michael Kunst (German Archaeological Institute) and Hans-Peter Uerpmann (University of Tübingen). With the support of the Municipal Council of Torres Vedras, Kunst has continued the excavations.

== History ==
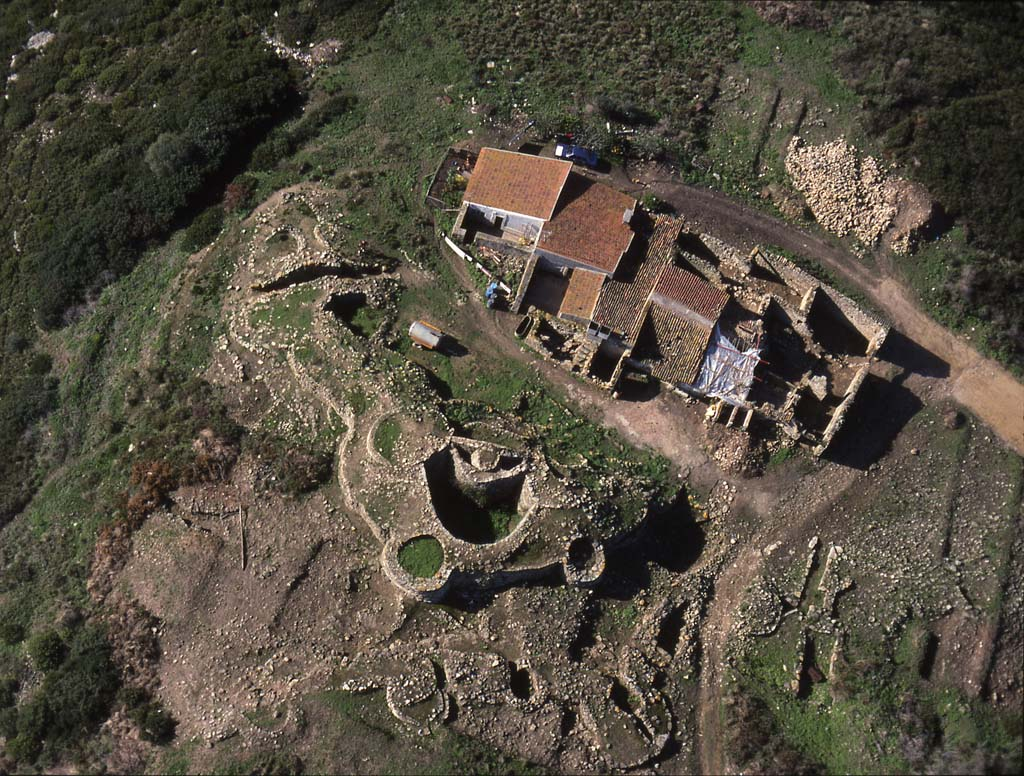
The Copper Age nucleus of the fortified site of Zambujal in October 1994

The site was first occupied in the Chalcolithic period, at the beginning of the 3rd millennium BC. Research from the last 30 years suggests that the region of the actual Portuguese Estremadura in Central Portugal was the region where the “Bell Beaker” phenomenon started, around the middle of the 3rd millennium BC, and from there spread to other European regions during the later Chalcolithic or early Bronze Age.

Zambujal from this period is relatively well conserved, some walls still standing up to a height of 4 meters, and is one of the most important sites with extensive stratigraphy. The site and surrounding land was specifically tied to a chalcolithic settlement that constructed a wall around itself to protect its community from attack. The settlers, who may have been from the peninsula but perhaps with Eastern Mediterranean contacts, based their economy on intensive farming. They were also part of an economic network importing commodities like gold, copper, amphibolite stone, and ivory between 3000 and 1700 BC.

Animation showing five of the constructive phases on the site according to E. Sangmeister and H. Schubart, updated by the new excavations of M. Kunst

Based on the excavations and analysis of Sangmeister, Schubart, and Trindade (1969), the site went through several successive phases of occupation and development:

- construction of "soft walls", relatively straight, yet, narrow channels, with the fortifications developing in sections;
- reinforcement of the northern gateway, through the construction of new soft bastions, and reinforcement of sections;
- reinforcement of all walls, construction of small semi-circular towers, and sections;
- fortification of the walls, construction of large semi-circular towers, completed in sections;
- free-form walls constructed using small slabs, the construction of projecting barbicans, also completed in sections;
- constructed of massive buildings surrounding the structure;
- towers covered by cupolas developed in the interior, rounded spaces, while the fortifications were reinforced, around 1700 BC

Although uncertain as to the date, the fortification was partially destroyed (principally the central structures) to construct a rural adobe farmhouse (today known as the Casal do Zambujal).

== Architecture ==
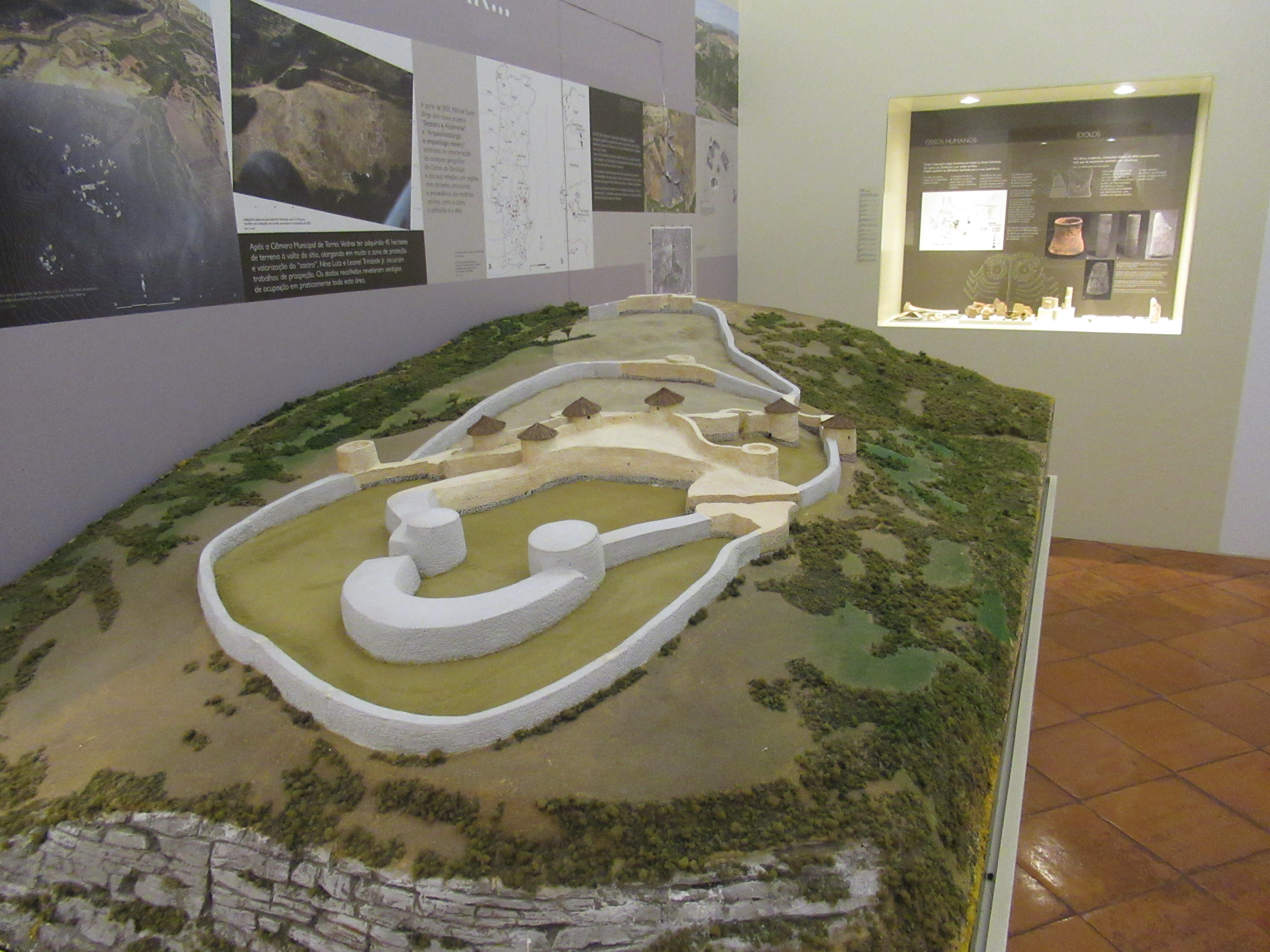
Architectural model of the Castro of Zambujal in Leonel Trindade Municipal Museum

The site is located in the semi-rural area of the parish of Santa Maria do Castelo e São Miguel, along one of the flanks of the Serra do Varatojo mountain range. Situated on a platform, the location extends down towards the Sizandro River, approximately 3 kilometres (1.9 mi) from the urban center of Torres Vedras.

The houses on-site were oval shaped, approximately 6 metres (20 ft) in diameter, and made from adobe.

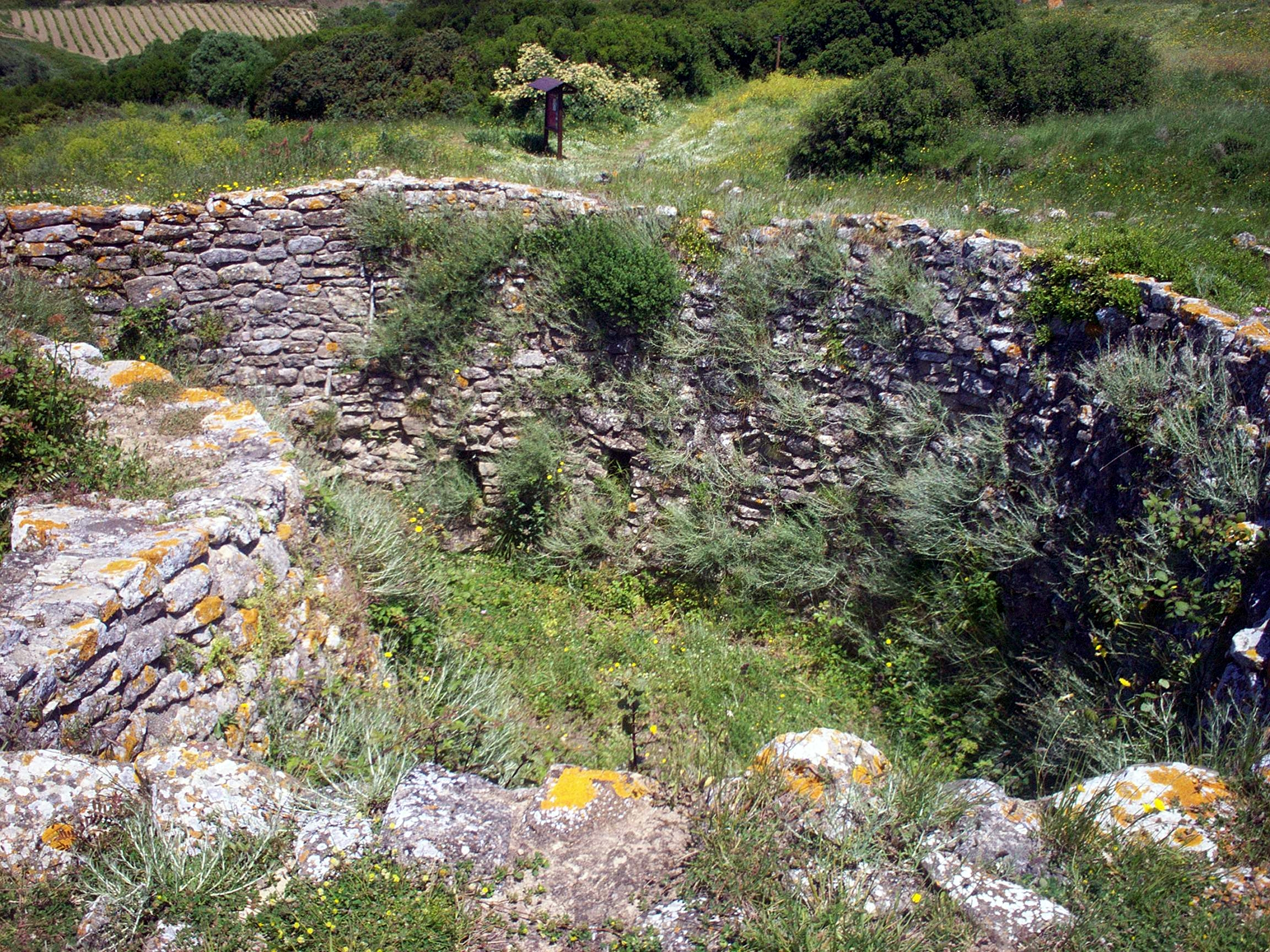
The inner wall constituting the barbican built in the 2nd phase of occupation

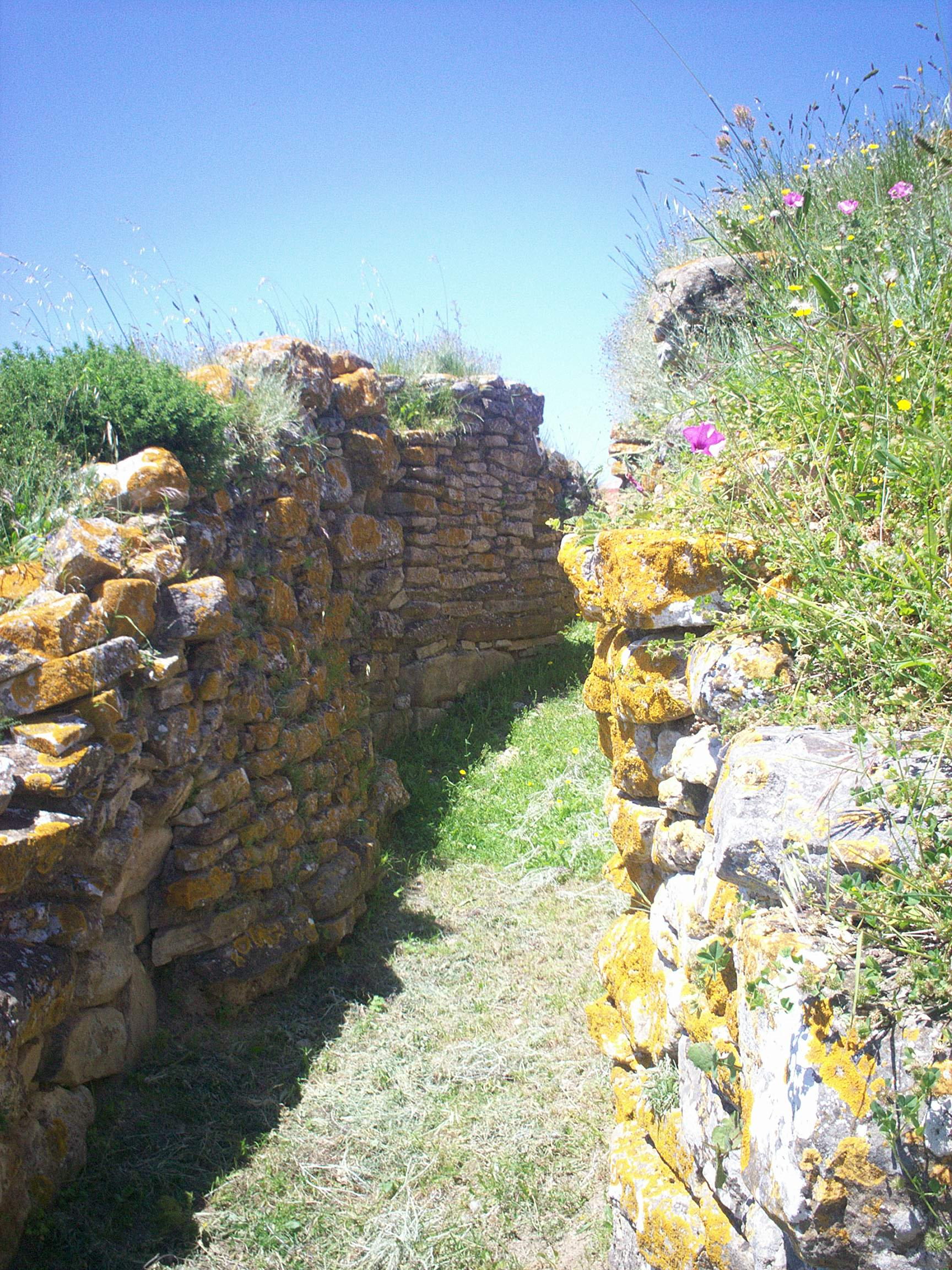
An access corridor between the individual sections of the site

== Current projects ==
To prevent further ruin of the archaeology, the Municipal Council of Torres Vedras acquired 48 hectares to guarantee the protection of the national monument in 2006.

The Portuguese Institute of Architectural Patrimony and Archaeology (IPPAR) has an architectural project to restore the adobe houses adjacent to the site, as well as a landscaping project, which included fencing the site, creating greenspaces, and the construction of support facilities, walkways, trails, explanatory signs, and a small museum.

== See also ==
- Bell Beaker culture
- Castro of Vila Nova de São Pedro
- Castelo Velho de Freixo de Numão
- Castro de Leceia
- Los Millares
- Valencina de la Concepción
- Castro culture
- Tholos do Barro, a nearby chalcolithic burial chamber
