= Leonel Trindade Municipal Museum =

Archaeological and historical museum, Portugal

Leonel Trindade Municipal Museum, Torres Vedras
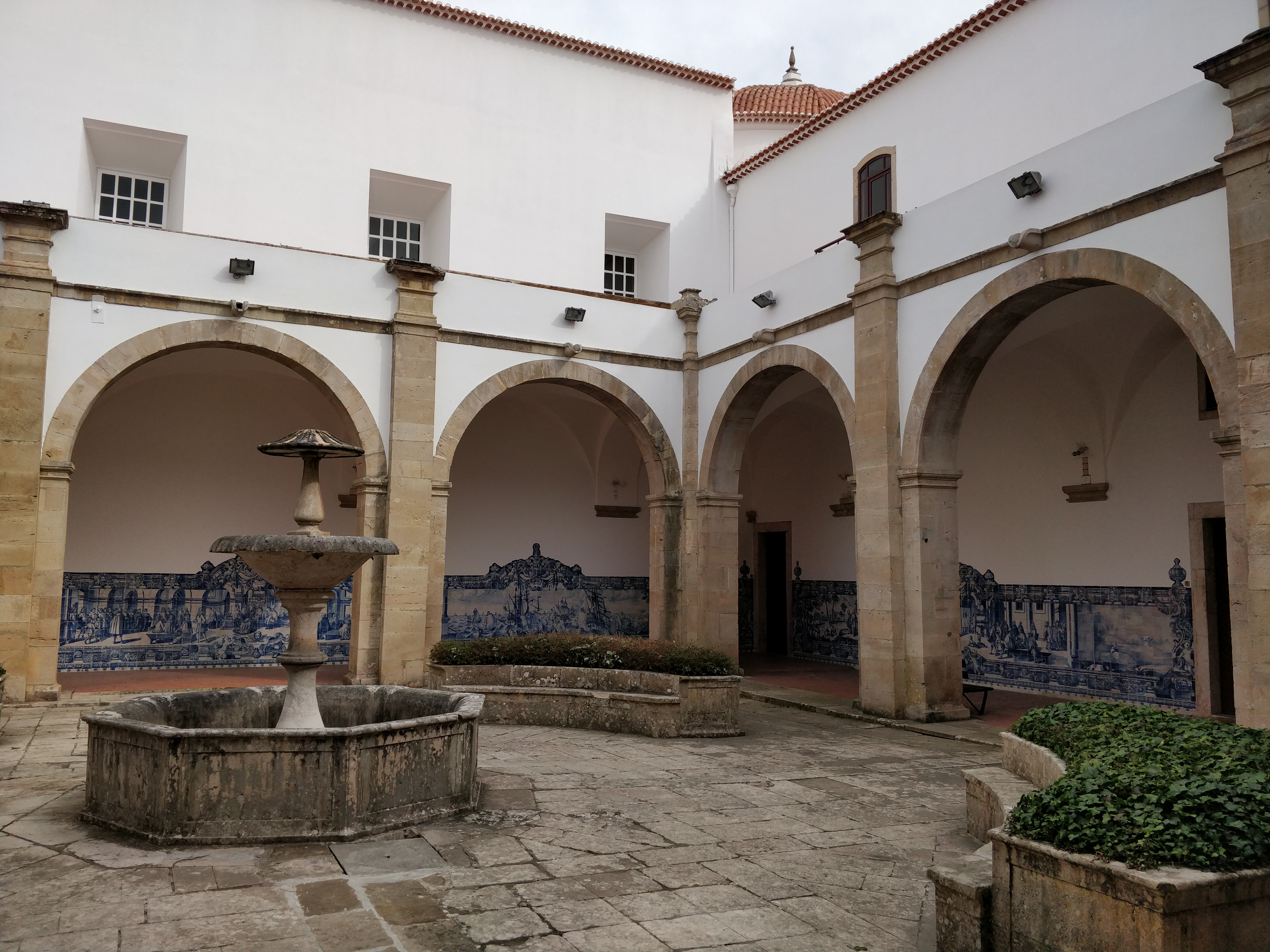
- Established: 1929
- Location: Praça 25 de Abril, Convento de Nossa Senhora da Graça, 2560-286 Torres Vedras, Portugal
- Coordinates: 39.0903°N 9.2590°W
- Collection size: Archaeology; Local history; Peninsular War
- Website: https://www.cm-tvedras.pt/viver/cultura/museu-municipal/

The Leonel Trindade Municipal Museum is an archaeological and historical museum in the town and municipality of Torres Vedras, Lisbon District, Portugal. It is located in a former convent (Convento da Graça) on the southern edge of the city centre. In addition to an extensive archaeological section dating back to late- Palaeolithic times, the museum contains works of art from local churches as well as an exhibition relating to the Lines of Torres Vedras, defensive lines constructed under the orders of the British Duke of Wellington to defend against French invasion during the Peninsular War.

== History ==
The Municipal Museum of Torres Vedras was founded in 1929. It was initially installed in rooms attached to the church of St. Peter (S. Pedro), identifying itself as a “Museum of History, Archaeology and Prehistory”. In 1944 the museum and the city library were transferred to the headquarters of the Brotherhood of Santa Casa da Misericórdia. Leonel Trindade (1903-92), a leading archaeologist in the region and former deputy director, became the director in 1969. The library moved out in 1970, allowing the museum’s exhibition space to be significantly expanded and Trindade curated eight rooms covering: archaeology; the Napoleonic Wars; the Santa Casa da Misericóridia; early Portuguese culture; ceramic tiles; contemporary painting; the municipality of Torres Vedras; and epigraphy. In 1989, it was decided to transfer the exhibitions to the Graça Convent, and the permanent exhibition was inaugurated in 1992, giving particular attention to the archaeological findings from the Castro of Zambujal, situated a few kilometres from Torres Vedras. In 2007, the municipality named the museum after Leonel Trindade.

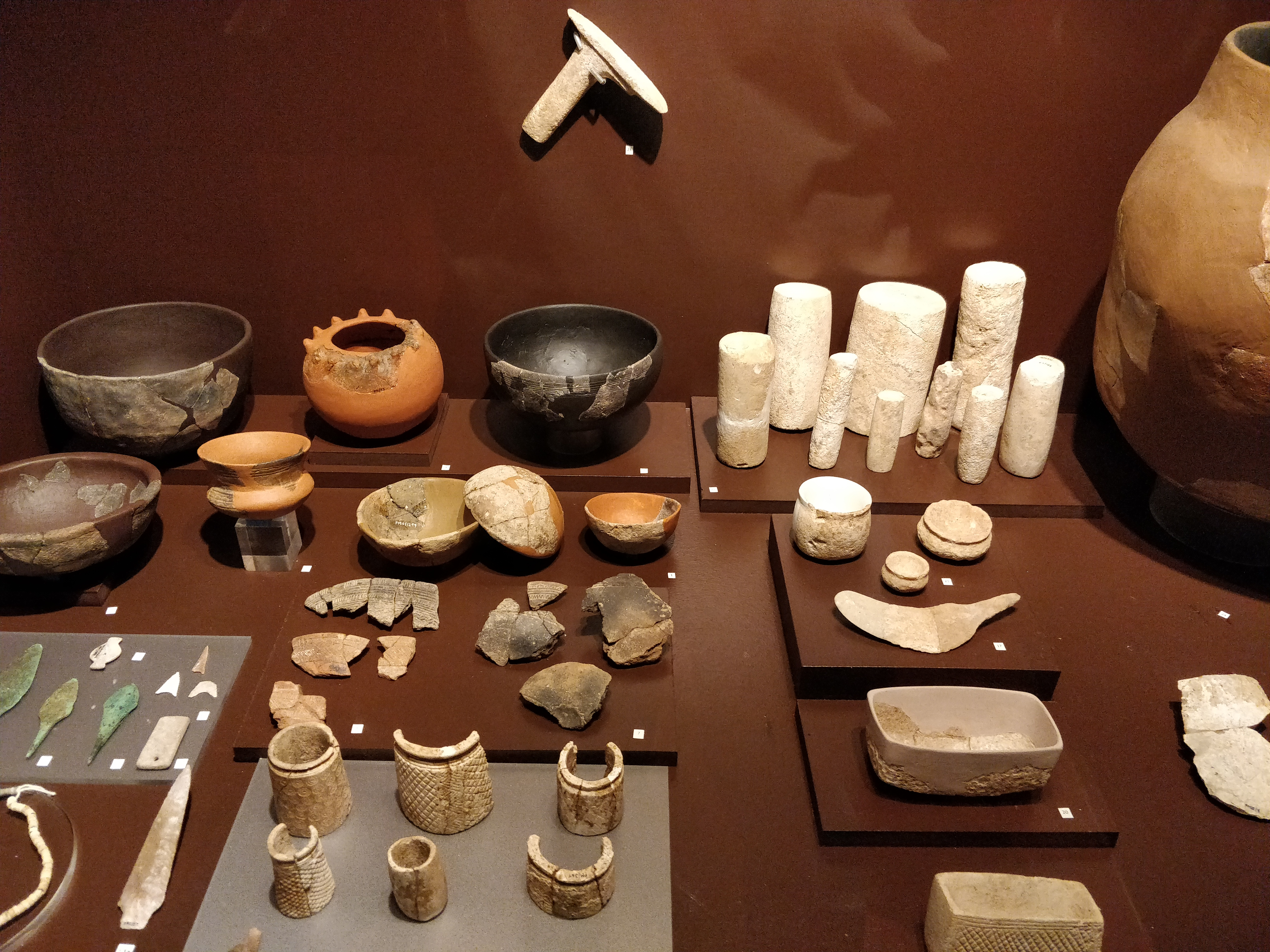
Archaeological display at the Leonel Trindade museum

== Collections ==
The collections cover palaeontology, archaeology, architecture and sculpture (16th and 17th centuries), and religious paintings from the 15th to 17th centuries, as well a section dedicated to the Peninsular War and the construction of the Lines of Torres Vedras (1809-10), so-called because the town was the first where the construction of the forts was started. Much of the archaeological collection comes from items collected by Trindade, who, among other places, discovered the Chalcolithic, fortified settlement of Zambujal (3rd millennium BC). Over the years, the museum has been increasing its collection, with special emphasis on archaeology, drawing in particular on the Neolithic sites in the Torres Vedras area, such as the Castro of Zambujal and the Tholos do Barro. It has one of the largest Portuguese collections of medieval burial headstones.

The late Palaeolithic period is represented by stone tools that were found mainly in the sand dunes at Santa Cruz and Cambelas in the Torres Vedras municipality. A major Mesolithic site in Portugal is also located in the municipality, in the dunes at Ponta da Vigia. Numerous Neolithic and Chalcolithic sites have provided items for the museum’s collection, particularly domed tombs. Vessels of the Bell Beaker culture from around 2800 BC are also well represented. Noteworthy are items from the Mesolithic necropolis of Cabeço da Arruda, located south of Santarém in Portugal, as well as various Phoenician items from the Iron Age from around 700 BC, giving rise to the belief that an Iron Age settlement existed in Torres Vedras that had trade contacts with the Phoenicians. In the Roman section, in addition to remains of ceramics, mosaics, jewellery and metal objects from Roman villas in the area, there are also a number of inscribed stones. From the early Middle Ages comes the museum’s collection of tombstones.

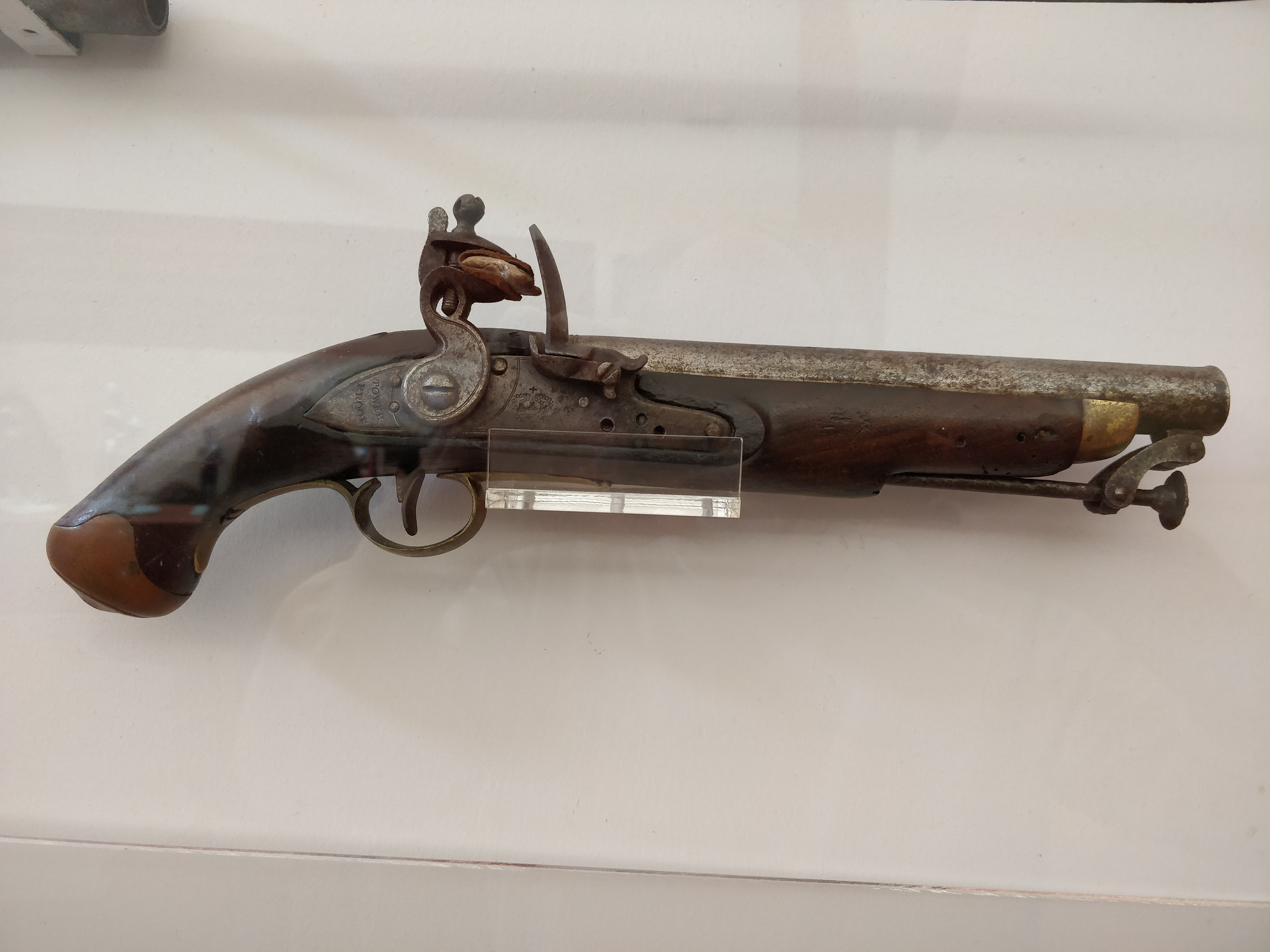
"New Land" pistol on display at Leonel Trindade Museum

In 1809 and 1810 a total of 152 forts, redoubts and other defences were developed as part of three defensive lines between the Atlantic Ocean and the River Tagus that were designed by the Duke of Wellington to protect the Portuguese capital, Lisbon, from possible invasion by French troops during the Peninsular War. These came to be known as the Lines of Torres Vedras. In Torres Vedras, itself, the castle was adapted for the purpose and several new forts constructed, including the Fort of São Vicente and the Fort of Olheiros. The museum’s exhibition describes the way in which the Lines were planned and has items from the time including guns and military costumes.
