= El Argar =

Bronze age site in southern Spain

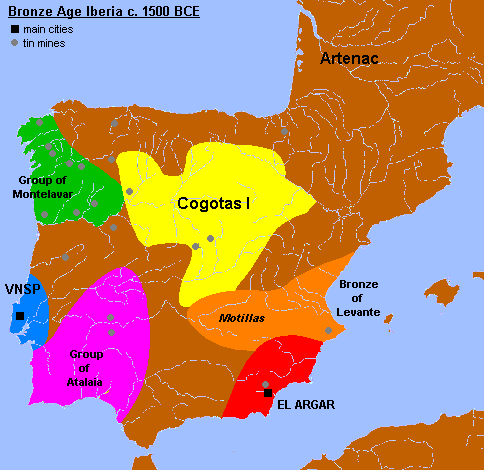
- Periods: Bronze Age
- Region: Southeast Spain

El Argar is an archeological site for the Early Bronze Age Argaric culture developed in the municipality of Antas, in Almeria (south-eastern end of the Iberian Peninsula) which was believed to have been active from about 2200 BC to 1500 BC. It is part of the archaeological zone of El Argar and La Gerundia, and it gives name to the Argaric culture.

== Chronology ==
Based on the structures and grave goods excavated on the site, B. Blance established a chronological sequence divided in two different periods, A and B. Later this sequence was revisited and expanded according to the information given by other archaeological sites:

- Argar I or initial (Argar A according to the first naming), with cists and some burials, as well as inverted-bell beaker vessels and argaric halberds.
- Argar II or Ancient Argar (also Argar A), close to the previous one in the remains found on it, but tendent to argaric rituals.
- Argar III or High Argar (Argar B, according to the first naming), with a predominance of pithoi and grave goods composed of daggers, axes, swords, Montejícar-type halberds and personal ornaments.
- Argar IV or Late Argar (Argar C), with some elements from Cogotas I.

== Material culture ==
El Argar was the cultural center of the Early and Middle Bronze Age in Iberia. With an area of 16.000 m² and an estimated population of around 5000 inhabitants, it is one of the largest known settlements belonging to the Middle Bronze Age in the peninsula. More than a thousand graves have been found inside the houses themselves. It was strategically located on the top of a flat hill, protected by a wall, inside which rectangular houses of 8–10 m by 2.5 m have been found, as well as other housing estructures with an irregular or circular floor plan. The walls were built of wood and mud, raised on a stone plinth. The roof was made of reeds or branches and mud. The settlement had a complex urban planning that is characterized by the artificial creation of terraces, with an acropolis located at the highest part of the site..

Metallurgy of bronze and pseudo-bronze (alloyed with arsenic instead of tin) was practiced. Weapons are the main metallurgic product: knives, halberds, swords, spear and arrow points, and big axes with curved edges are all abundant, not just in the Argaric area, but also elsewhere in Iberia.

The women at this site were buried with numerous grave goods of silver, treasure that suggests that women held high status in the society. For instance, excavation of Grave 38 began in 2014, and it contains burial goods estimated to be worth tens of thousands of dollars and included a diadem. The burial was found below a unique building, when compared to the others excavated. The building above the grave appears to be a great hall, with benches along the sides that could seat up to 60 people. This suggests that the hall was used for politics. The grave and hall have been radiocarbon dated to approximately 1700 BC.

== Gallery ==
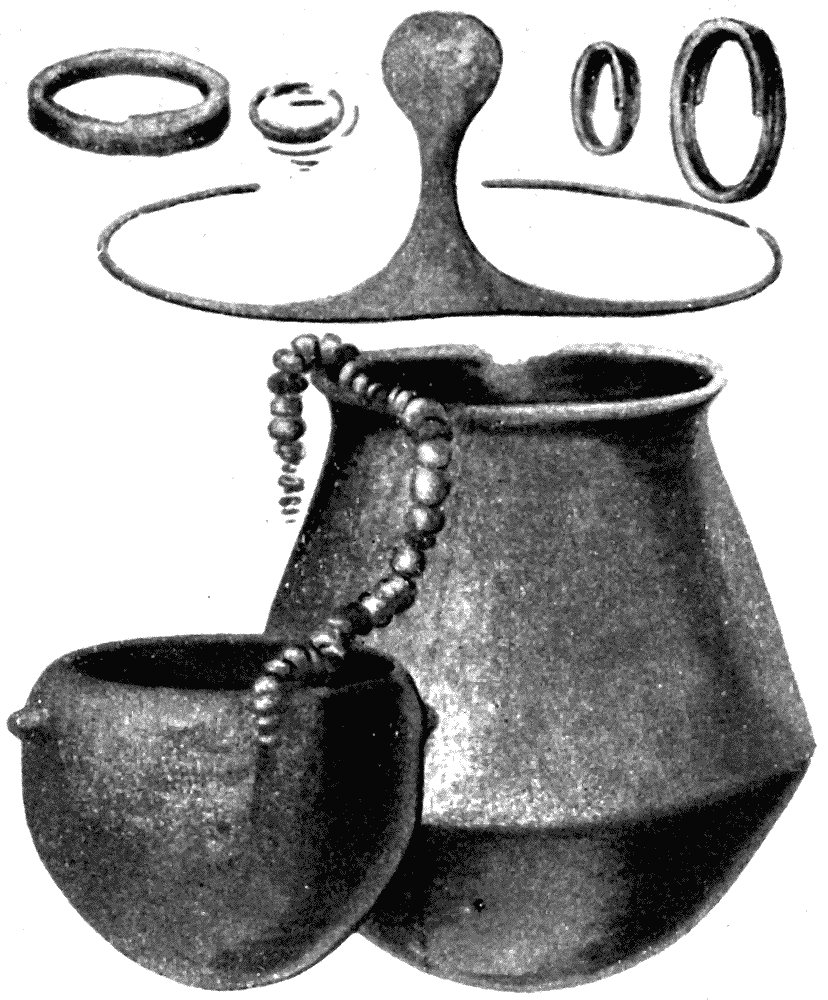
Grave goods

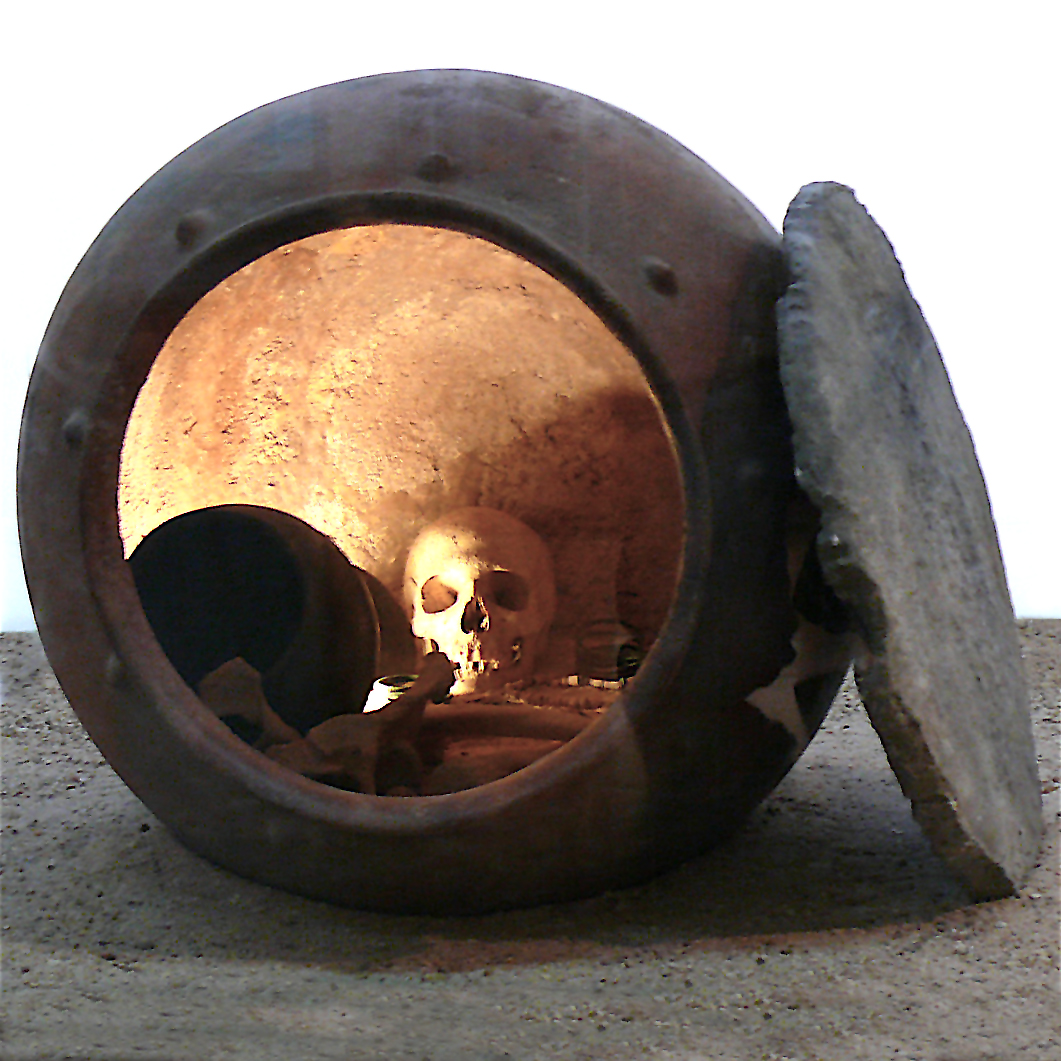
Typical jar burial
El Argar B

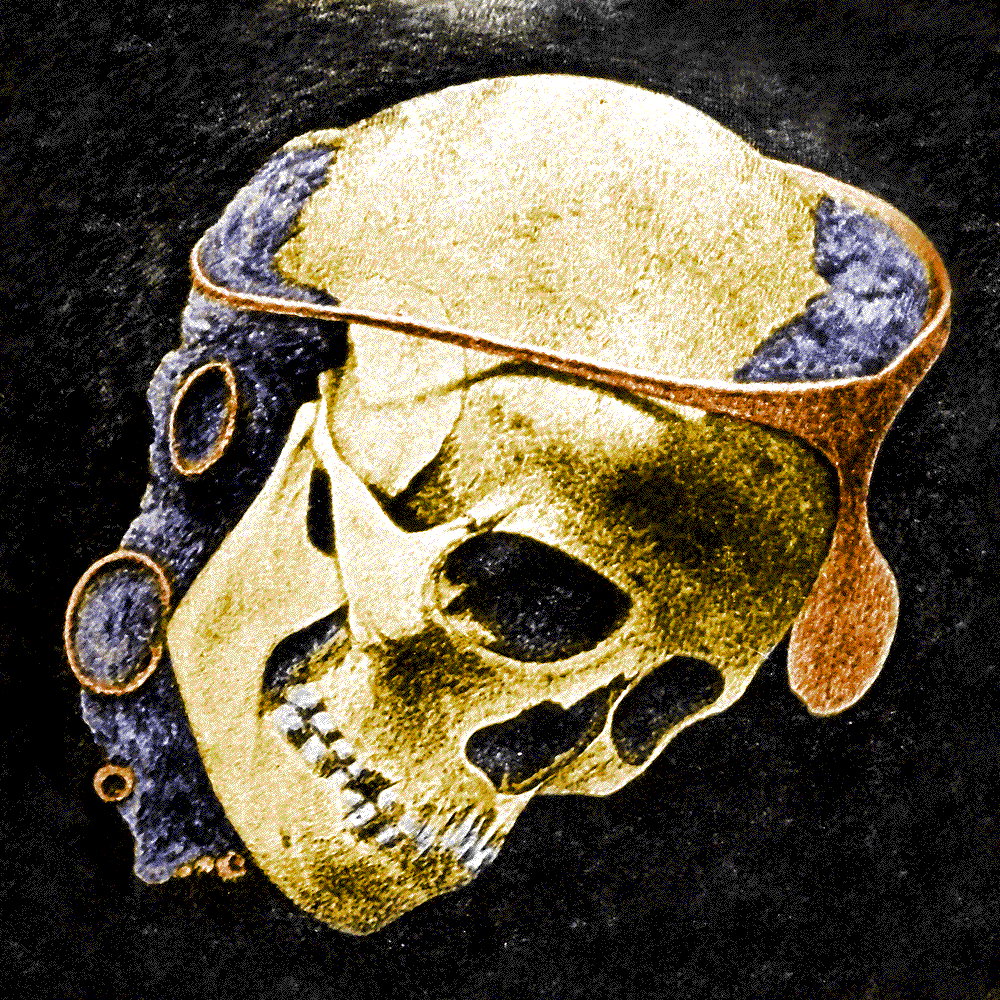
Woman's skull
with diadem

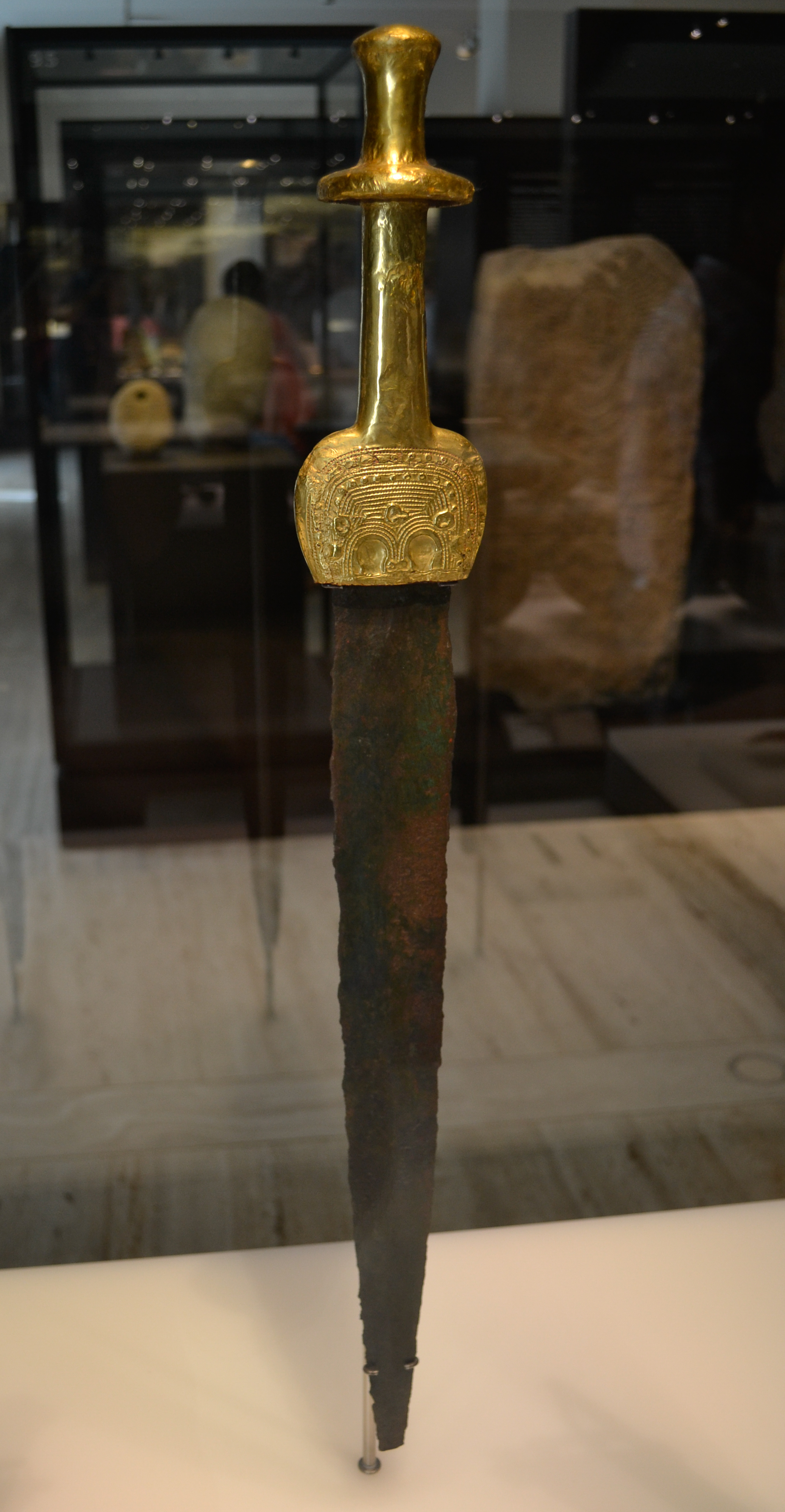
Bronze sword with gold-covered hilt

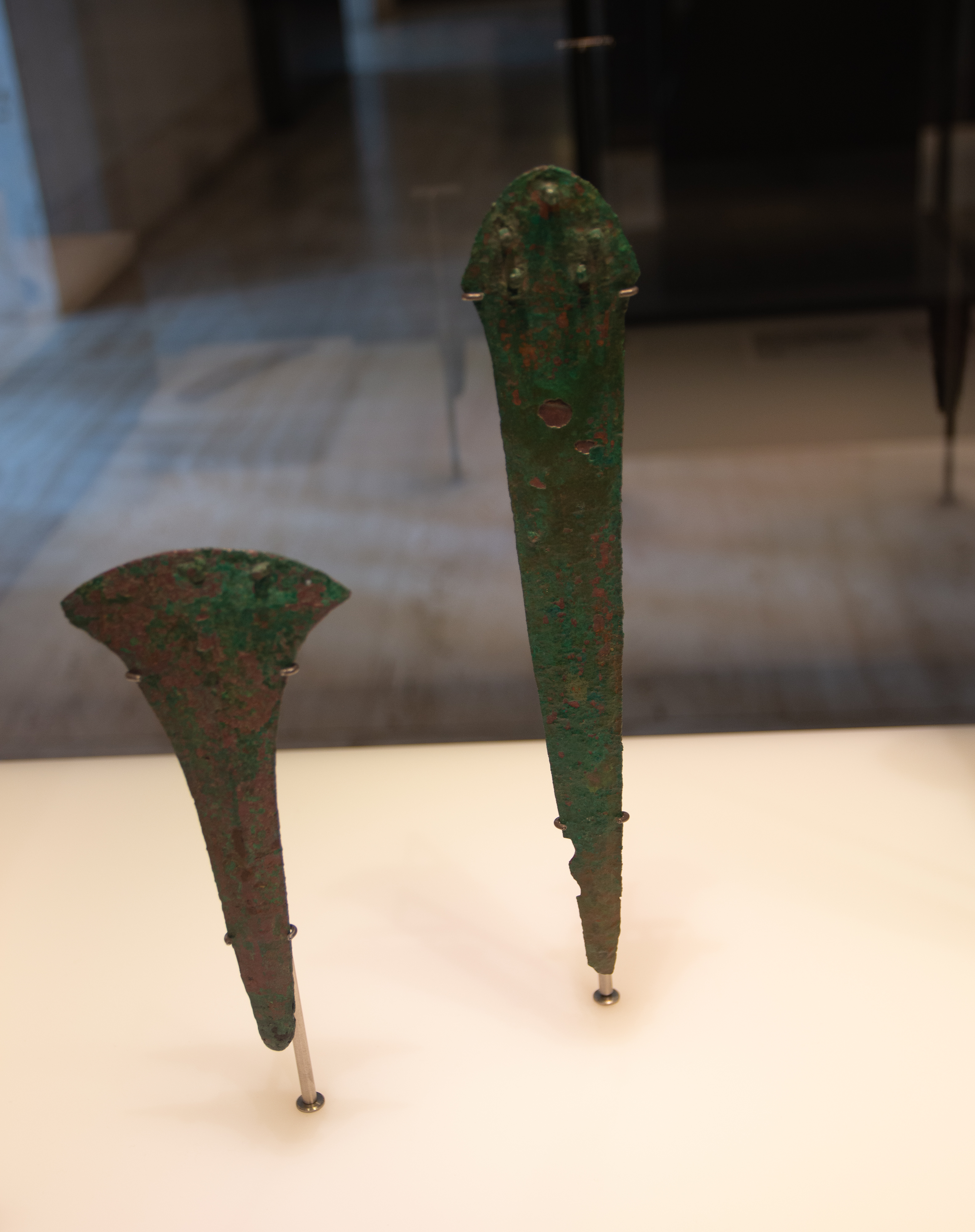
Bronze axe and dagger blade

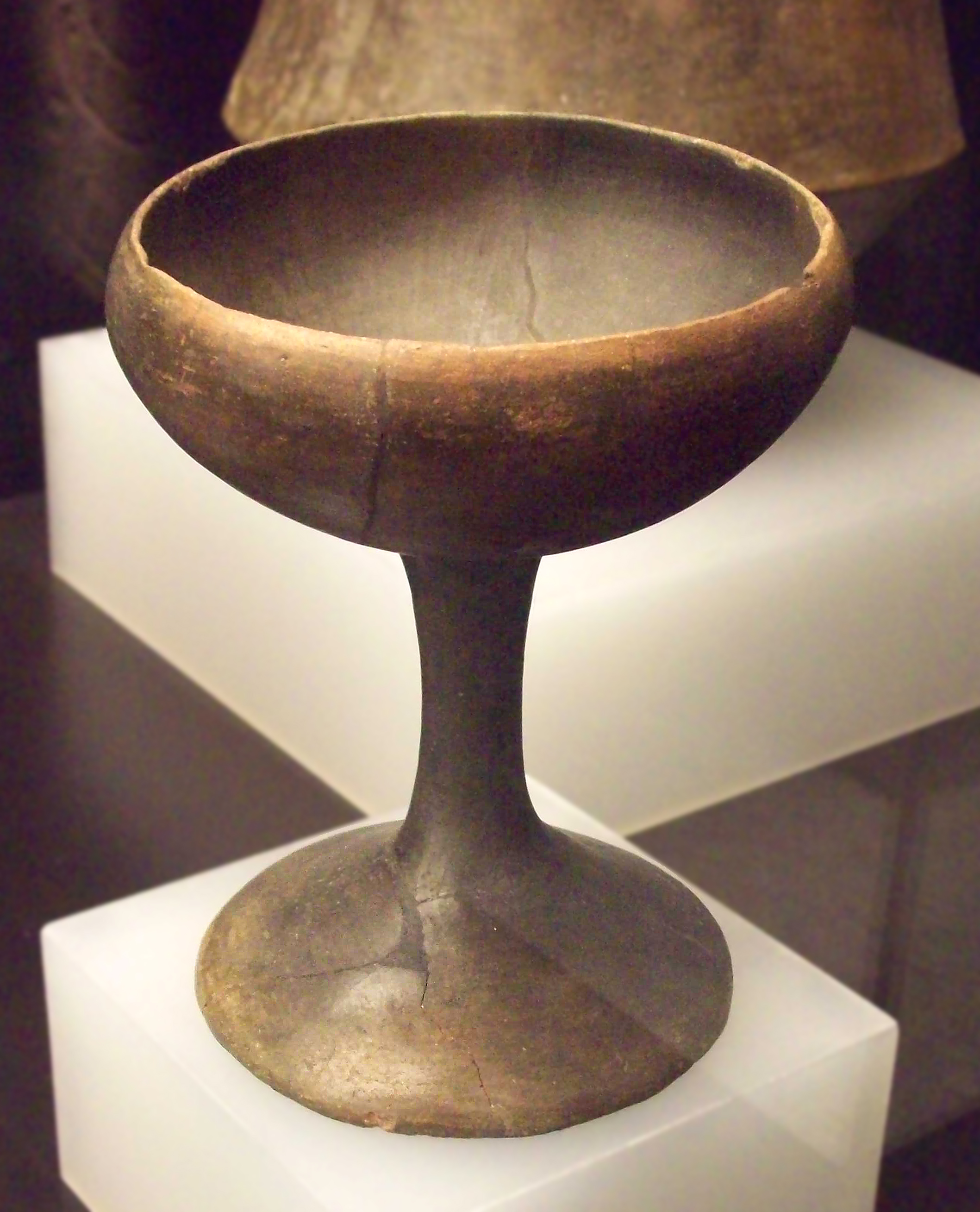
Ceramic cup

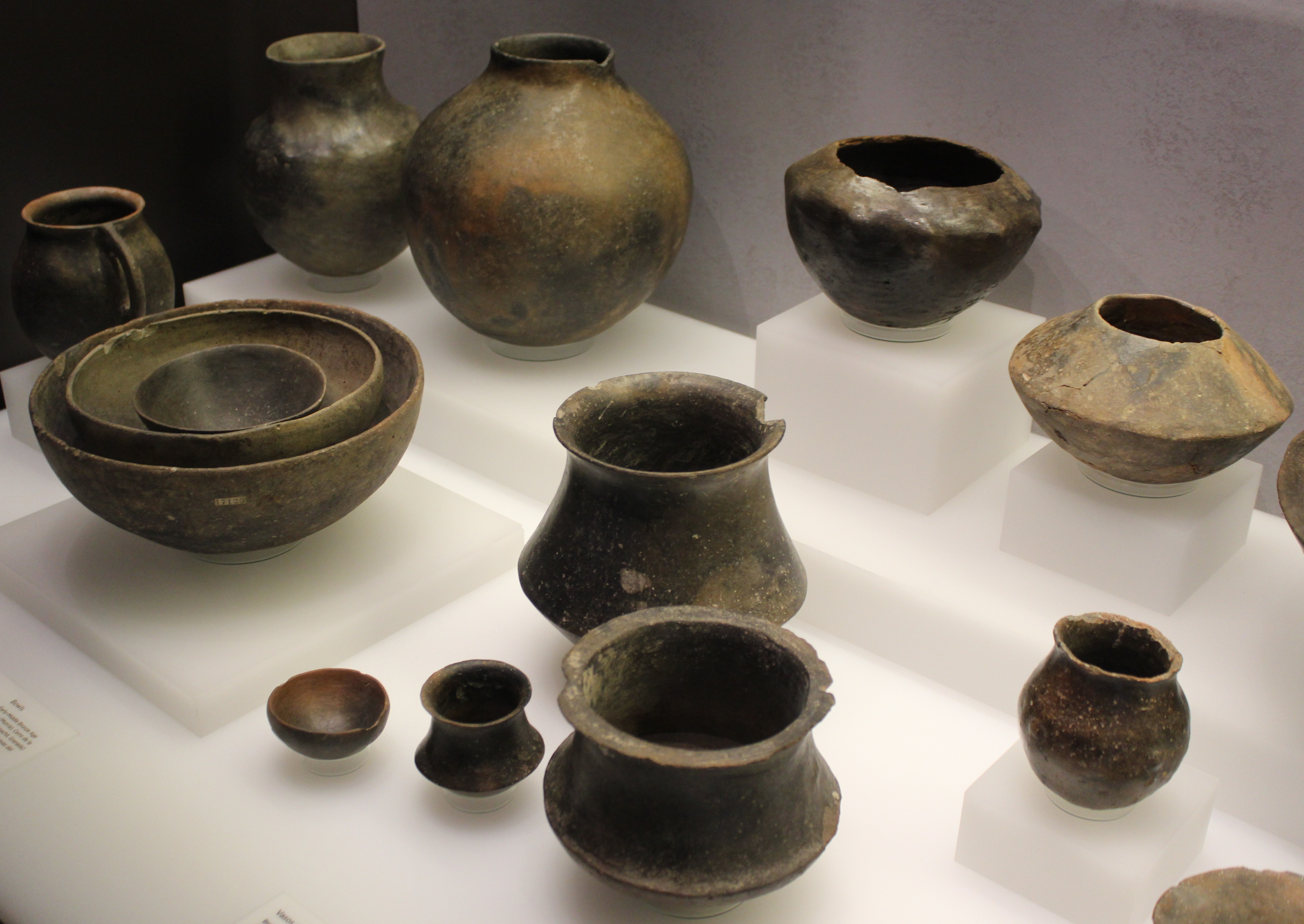
Pottery

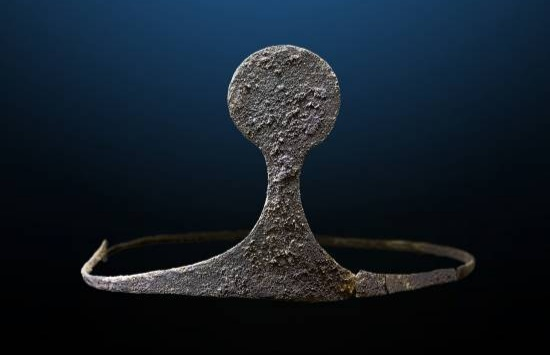
Silver diadem from La Almoloya.

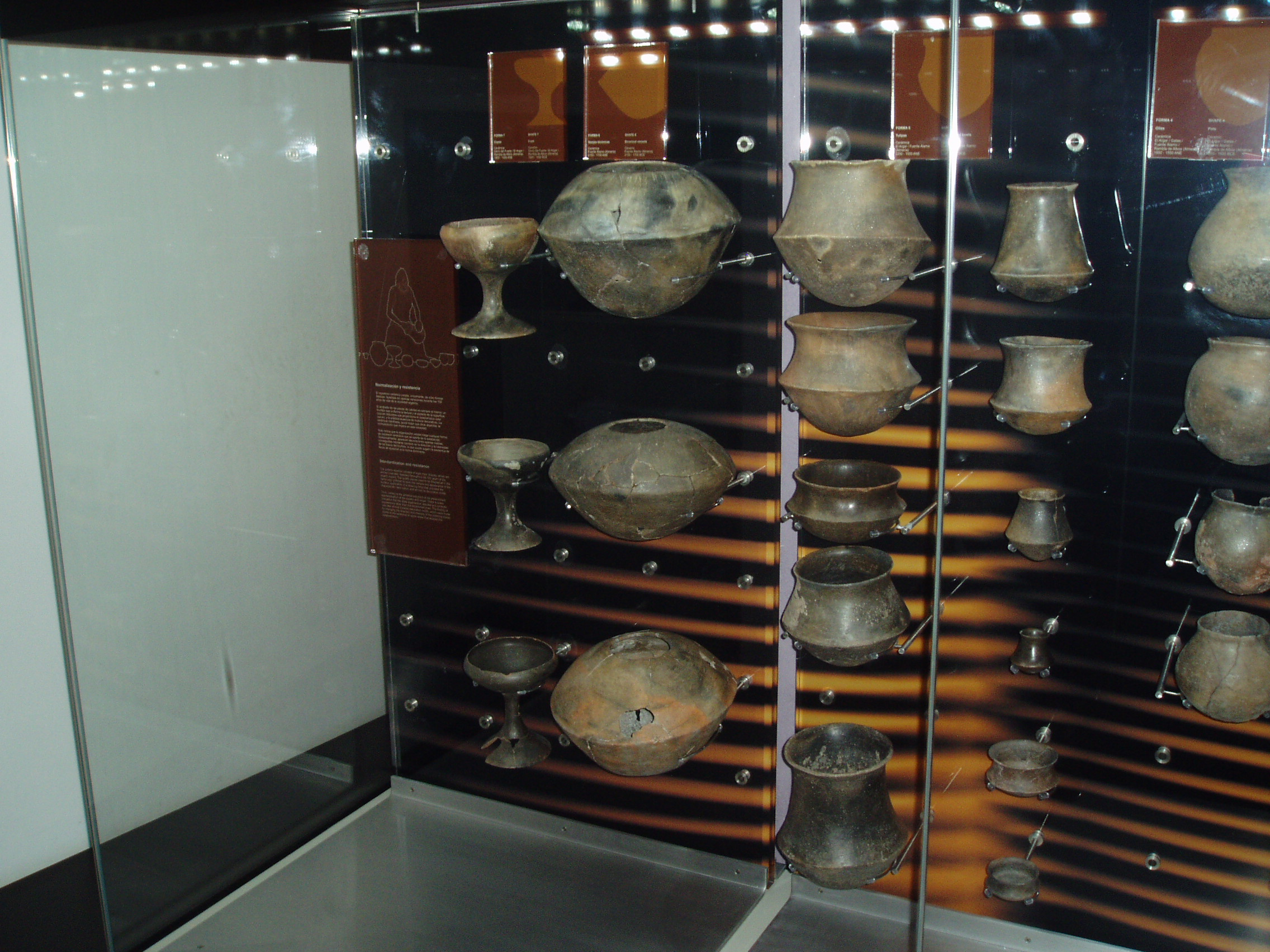
Pottery

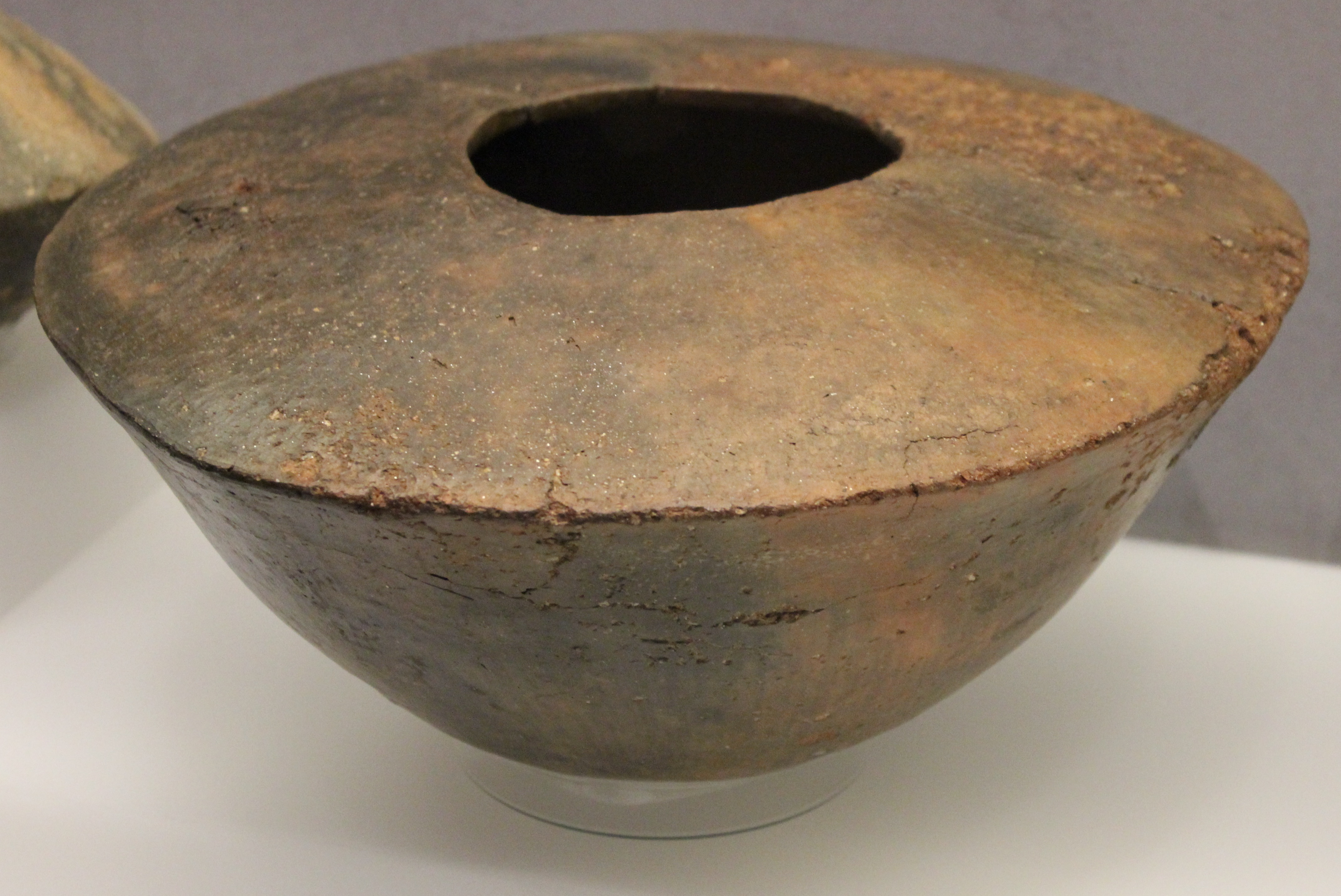
Pottery

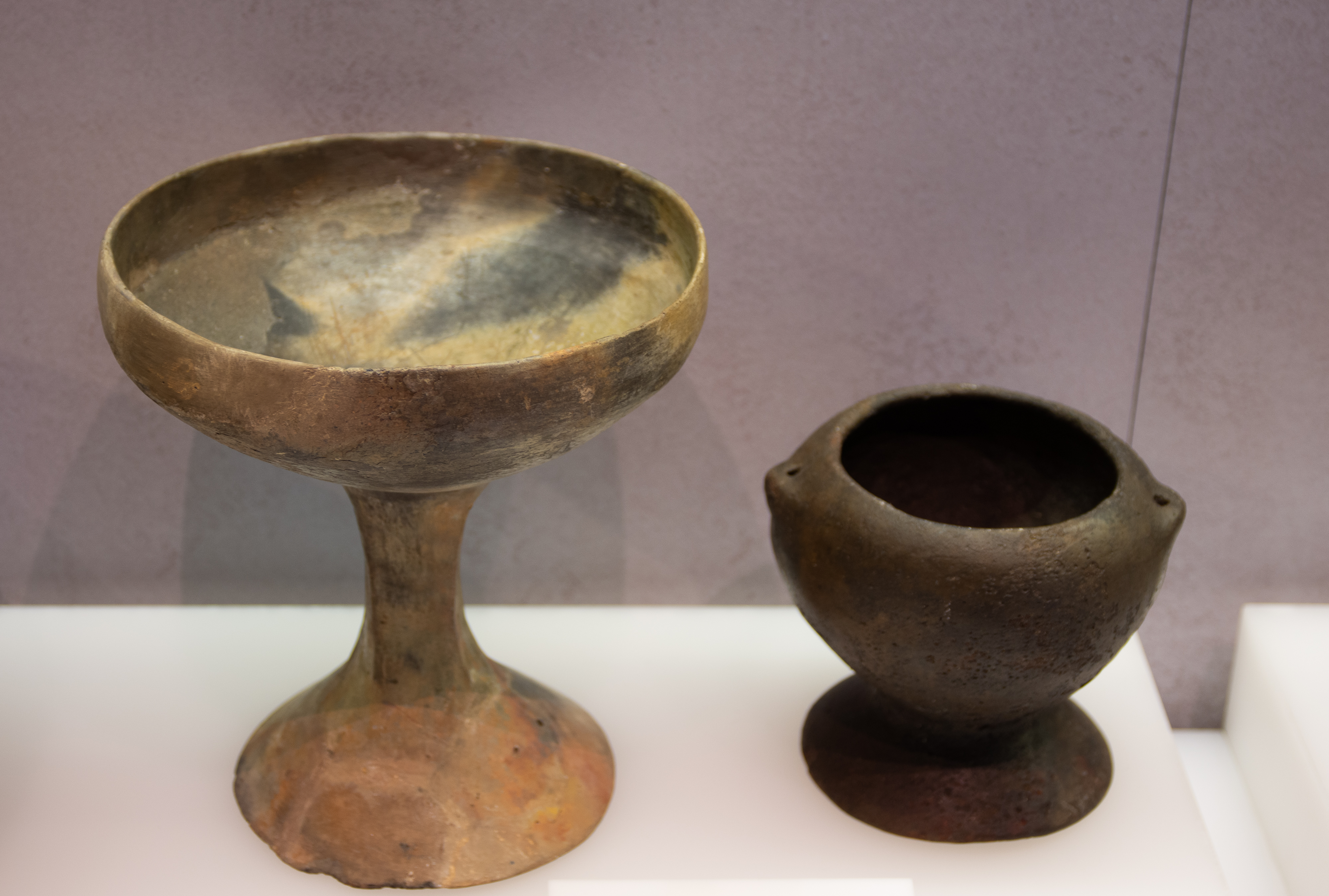
Ceramics

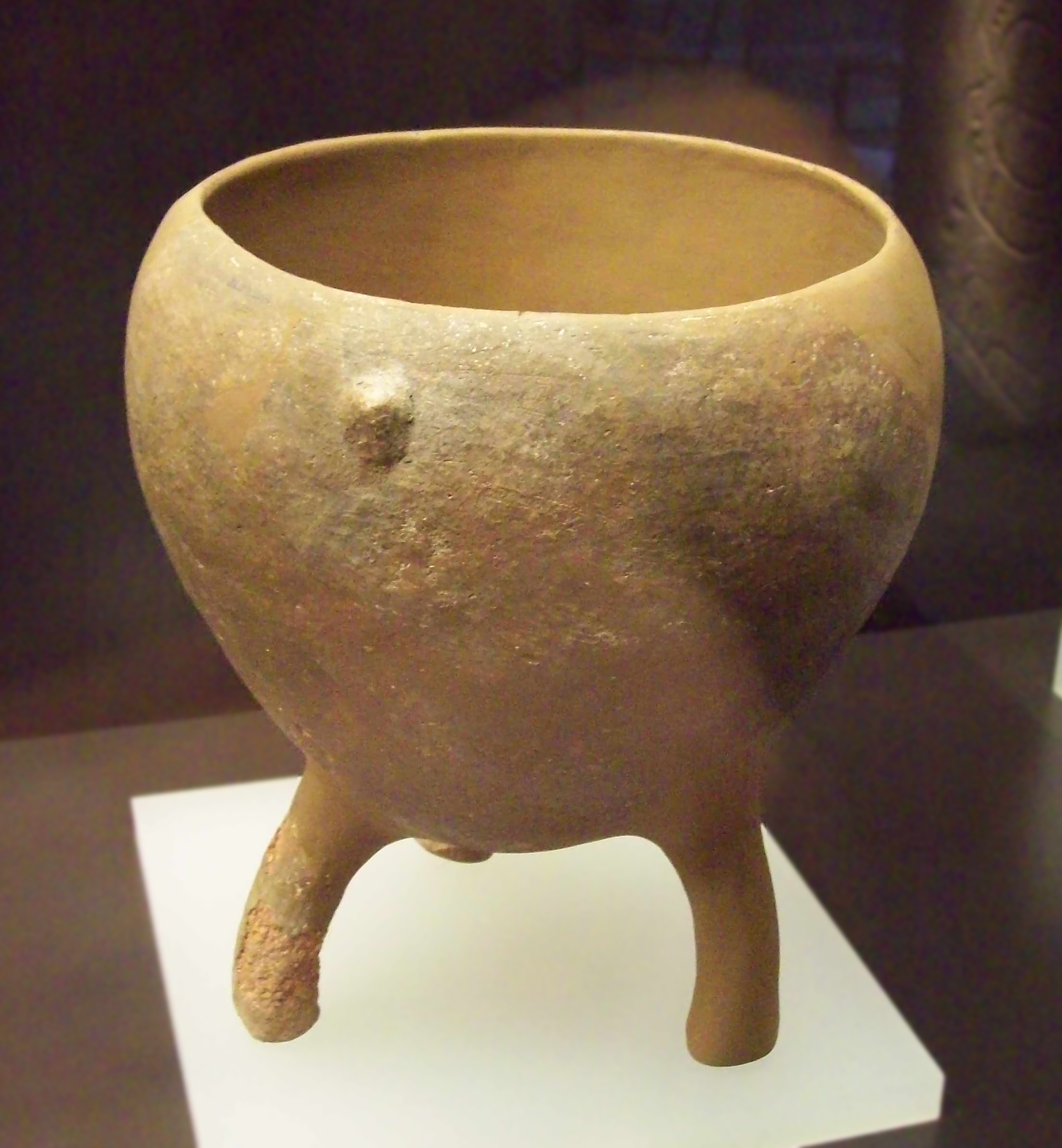
Ceramics

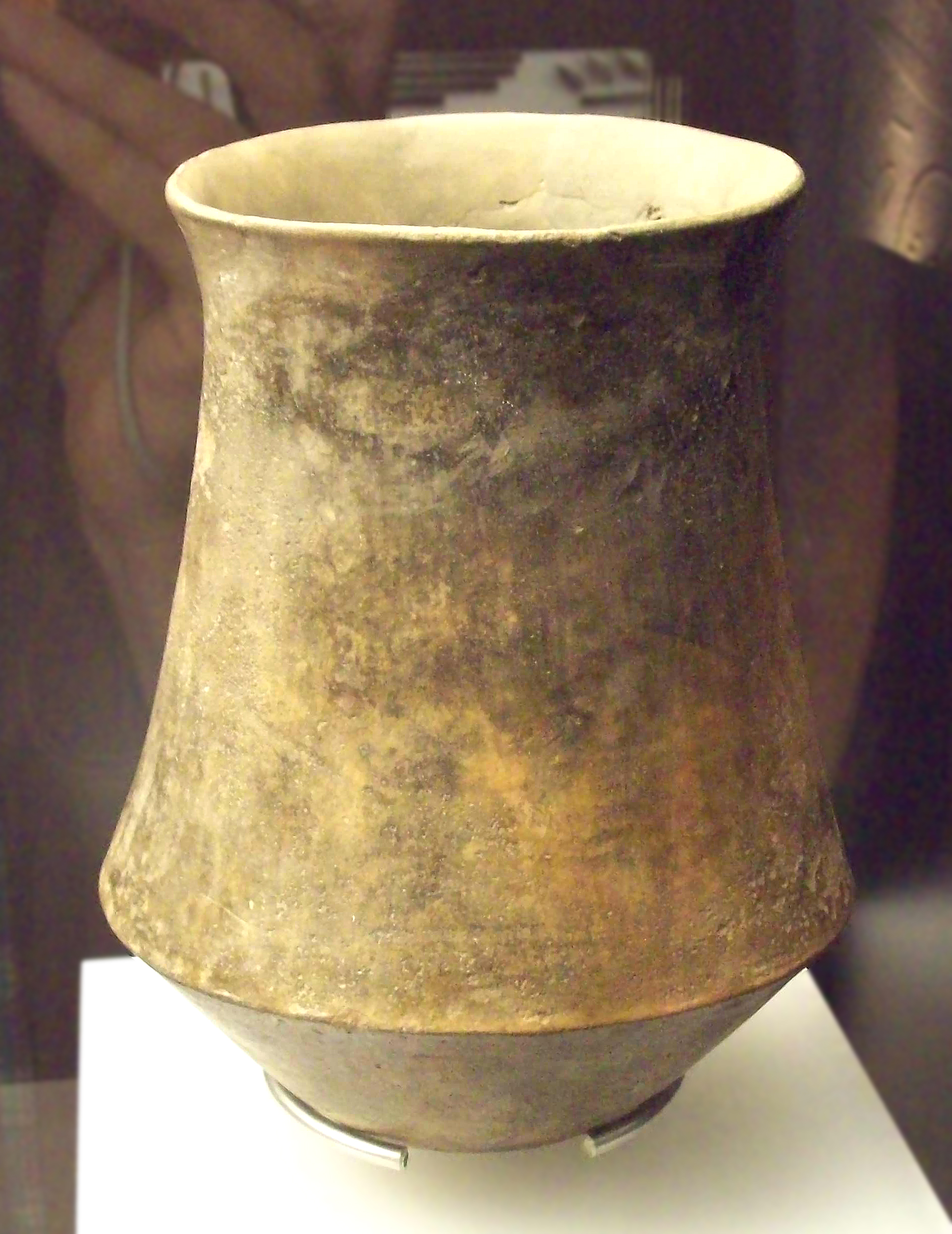
Ceramic vase

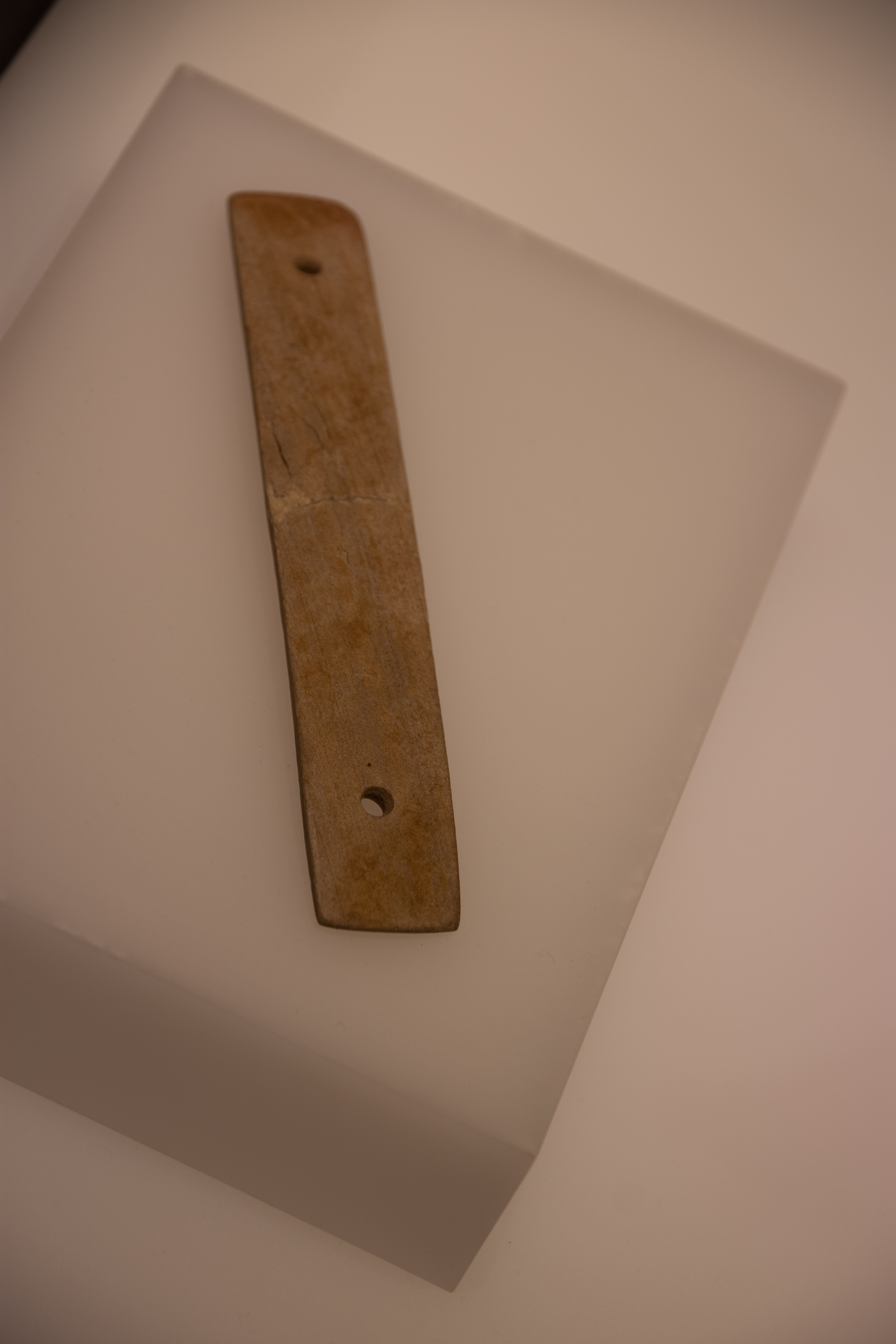
Archer's wristguard

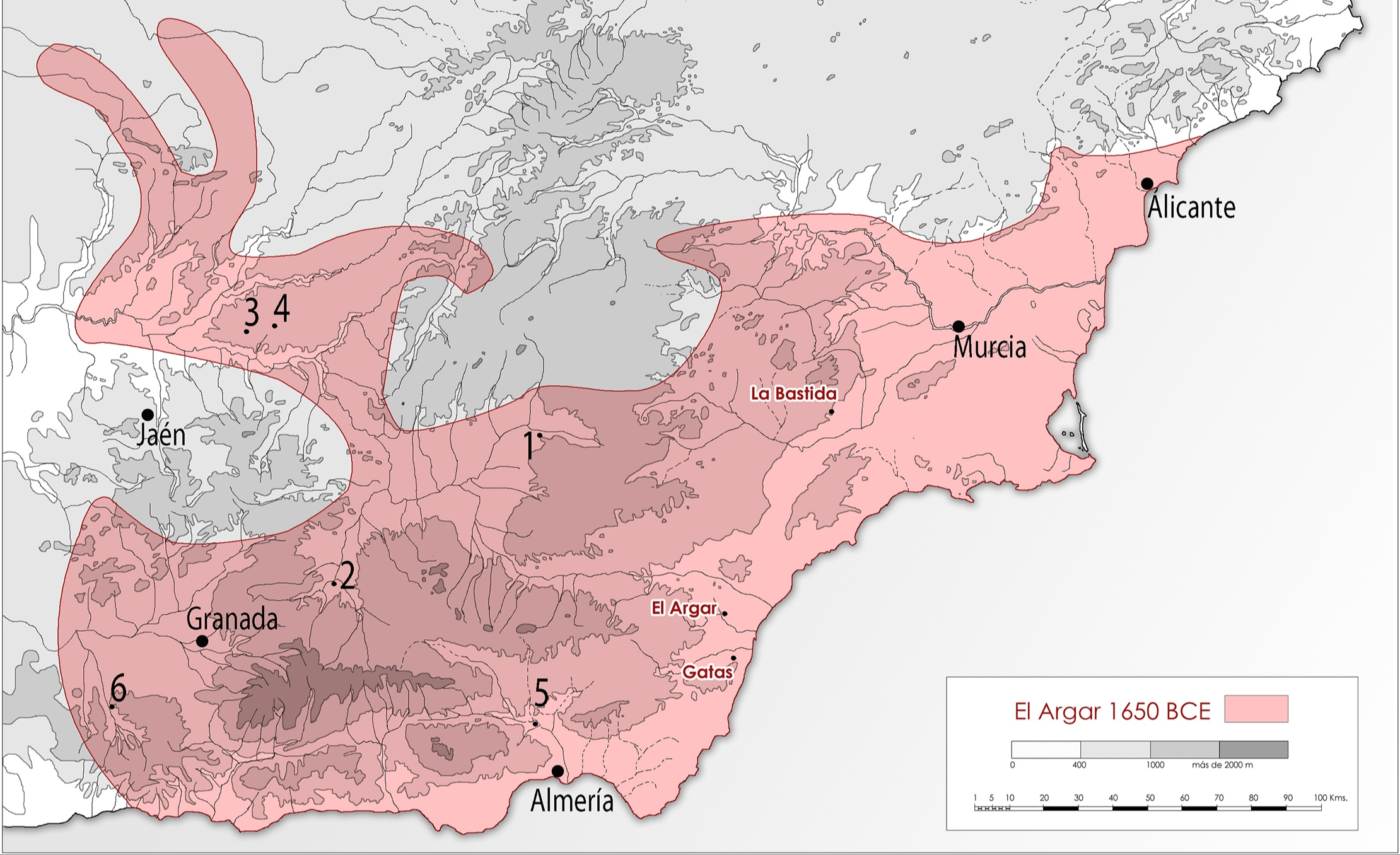
Map of El Argar

== Bibliography ==
- Castro, Pedro V. (2001). "La sociedad argárica". In Ruiz-Gálvez Priego, Marisa (ed.). La Edad del Bronce ¿Primera Edad de Oro de España? Sociedad, economía e ideología. Barcelona: Crítica. ISBN 84-8432-299-8.
- Eiroa García, Jorge Juan (2010). Prehistoria del mundo (1st ed.). Barcelona: Sello Editorial SL. ISBN 978-84-937381-5-0.
- Gilman Guillén, Antonio (1999). "Veinte años de Prehistoria funcionalista en el sureste de España". Boletín del seminario de estudios de Arte y Arqueología (65): 73–98.
- González Marcén, Paloma; Lull, Vicente; Risch, Robert (1992). Arqueología de Europa, 2250-1200 a. C. Una introducción a la "Edad del Bronce" (1 ª ed.). Madrid: Síntesis. ISBN 84-7738-128-3.
- Izquierdo Egea, Pascual (2016). "Midiendo las fluctuaciones de la economía argárica a través del registro funerario" (PDF). Arqueología Iberoamericana. 30: 77–90. ISSN 1989-4104.
- Lull, Vicente (1983). "La cultura del Argar. Un modelo para el estudio de las formaciones económico-sociales prehistóricas" (PDF). Madrid. Archived from the original (PDF) on 1 October 2018.
- Siret, H.; Siret, L. (2006) [1890]. Las primeras edades del metal en el sudeste de España (Álbum) (pdf). Edición facsimilar. Murcia: Museo Arqueológico de Murcia.
