= Tholos do Barro =

Megalithic site near Sintra, Portugal

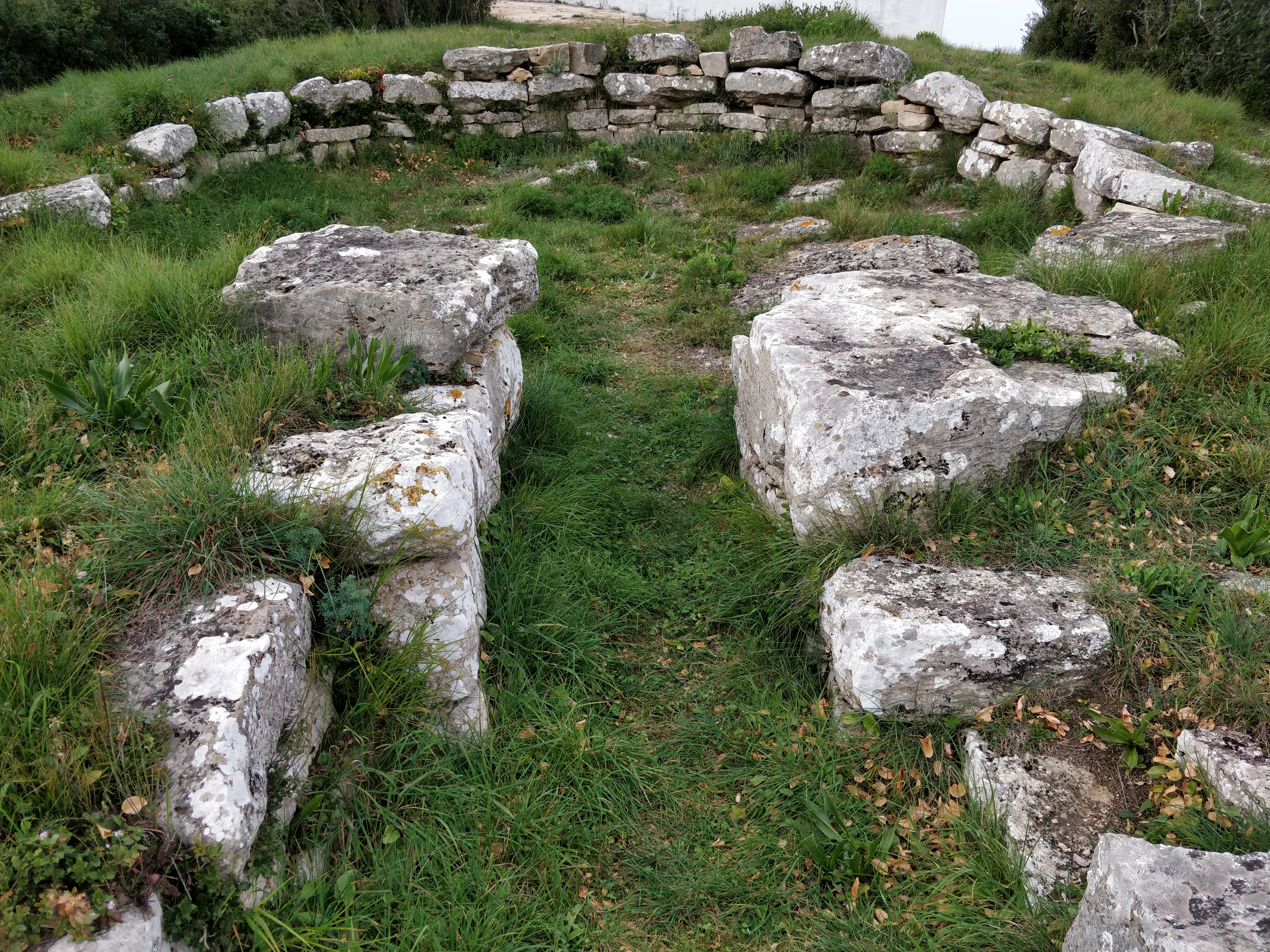
- The tomb in 2019
- Interactive map of Tholos do Barro
- 39°04′03″N 9°15′45″W
- Type: Tholos or Beehive tomb
- Location: Barro, Torres Vedras, Lisbon District, Portugal

History
- Built: c. 2350 BC

Site notes
- Material: Limestone
- Length: c. 13 meters
- Archaeologists: Eugene Jalhay and Félix Alves Pereira, 1909; Leisner and Leisner, 1965
- Discovered: 1908 by Paulo Lapierre
- Public access: Yes. Steep dirt-tracked road or 400 m on foot.

The Tholos do Barro (also known as the Tholos da Pena) was a Chalcolithic or Copper-Age domed tomb of block masonry. Its ruins are located on Monte da Pena, near the village of Barro, Torres Vedras municipality, in the Lisbon District of Portugal. The tholos was classified as a National Monument in September 1940.

== History ==
The Tholos do Barro is a megalithic monument dated between 2500 and 2200 BC. It is located close to a hilltop monument to Our Lady of Fátima. The tholos was discovered in 1908 by Paulo Bovier Lapierre, a French Jesuit priest who was teaching at the Barro college and convent at the foot of the hill. The tomb was excavated a year later by Eugene Jalhay and Félix Alves Pereira but the results of their excavations were not published. Among the items found at the site were implements made from amphibolite, diorite and granite, limestone idols and vessels, ceramics, bones, jewellery, a copper dagger, and metal rings. Cylindrical idols characteristic of the early Chalcolithic period permitted the tomb to be dated and it is considered to be contemporary with the nearby Castro of Zambujal, one of the most important chalcolithic sites in the Lisbon area. The finds are located in the Lisbon National Archaeological Museum and also in the Leonel Trindade Museum in Torres Vedras.

The tomb’s chamber was oriented from North to South, with a round burial chamber that was covered with overlapping blocks that created a false dome. This was an unusual construction for a tholos in Portugal, as a wooden roof was usually used. The wall of the chamber, six meters in diameter, is still about a meter high. It is believed that the dead were deposited in a seated position, accompanied by various artifacts and food. The chamber, aisle and antechamber together have a length of 9.7 metres. At the entrance, the remains of a wall of limestone blocks on both sides around 2.7 meters in length are interpreted as the remains of the antechamber. The tomb was surrounded by an outer tumulus made of small stones, with a diameter of around 13 metres.
