= Prehistoric Iberia =

Prehistory in the Iberian peninsula begins with the arrival of the first Homo genus representatives from Africa, which may range from c. 1.5 million years (Ma) ago to c. 1.25 Ma ago, depending on the dating technique employed, so it is set at c. 1.3 Ma ago for convenience.

The end of Iberian prehistory coincides with the first entrance of the Roman army into the peninsula, in 218 BC, which led to the progressive dissolution of pre-Roman peoples in Roman culture. This end date is also conventional, since pre-Roman writing systems can be traced to as early as 5th century BC.

== Overview ==
Prehistory in Iberia spans around 60 percent of the Quaternary, with written history occupying just 0.08 percent. For the other 40 percent, it was uninhabited by humans. The Pleistocene, first epoch of Quaternary, was characterized by climate oscillations between ice ages and interglacials that produced significant changes in Iberia's orography. The first and biggest period in Iberia's prehistory is the Paleolithic, which starts c. 1.3 Ma and ends almost coinciding with Pleistocene's ending, c. 11,500 years ago (11.5 ka). Significant evidence of an extended occupation of Iberia during this period by Homo neanderthalensis has been discovered. The first remains of Homo sapiens have been dated from towards the end of the Paleolithic. Homo Sapiens started to replace Homo neanderthalensis around 44,000 years ago (44 ka).

Holocene followed Pleistocene with a more homogeneous and humid climate, and the exclusive presence of Homo sapiens. It includes Mesolithic (c. 11.5 ka ago - 5.6 ka BC), Neolithic (c. 5.6 - 3.2 ka BC) and the Metal Ages: Chalcolithic or Copper Age (c. 3.2 - 1.9 ka BC), Bronze Age (c. 1.9 ka - 750 BC) and Iron Age (c. 750 - 218 BC). The Mesolithic and Chalcolithic are transition periods, where characteristics of both the preceding and following ages can be found. Holocene hosted several progressive transformations: territorial and cultural differentiation among Homo sapiens groups, birth of new social organizations and economies, transition from hunting-gathering to agriculture and animal husbandry, and arrival of new peoples from the Mediterranean Sea and central Europe, with foundation of colonies.

There are prehistoric remains scattered throughout the peninsula. Of notable importance is the archaeological site of Atapuerca, in northern Spain, containing a million years of human evolution and declared World Heritage Site by UNESCO in 2000.

== Paleolithic ==
=== Lower Paleolithic ===
The Lower Paleolithic begins in Iberia with the first human habitation c.1.3 Ma ago, and ends conventionally 128 ka ago, making it the longest period of Iberia's Paleolithic. It is mainly studied from the human fossils and stone tools found at archaeological sites, of which Atapuerca is of significant importance. It contains many animal and Homo antecessor fossils showing signs of stone tool manipulation for reaching the spinal cord, which constitute the first evidence of cannibalism among Homo.

At Sima de los Huesos archaeologists have found Homo heidelbergensis fossils, dated c. 430 ka ago, corresponding to around 30 individuals and with neither evidence of habitation nor of a catastrophic event, thus being hypothesized as the first evidence of Homo burial. DNA analysis from these fossils also suggest a process of continuous hybridization among Homo species throughout this period, until the final arrival of Homo neanderthalensis.

=== Middle Paleolithic ===
Middle Paleolithic (c. 128 – 40 ka ago) is dominated by an extended occupation of Iberia by Homo neanderthalensis or, more popularly, Neanderthals, who had a heavier body, higher lung volume and a bigger brain than Homo sapiens. Gorham's cave (Gibraltar) contains Neanderthal rock art, suggesting they had higher symbolic thought abilities than it was previously supposed. This period, like the previous one, is mainly studied from fossils and stone tools, which evolve into Mode 3 or Mousterian. There is no extended usage of bone or antlers for tool fabrication, and very little wood usage evidence remains because of decomposition.

By contrast with Lower Paleolithic, when habitation was usually in open air and caves were used circumstantially (burial, tool fabrication, butchering), throughout this period caves are increasingly used for habitation, with remains of archaic home conditioning. The Châtelperronian culture, mostly found in southern France, is contemporaneous to the period of time when both Homo neanderthalensis and Homo sapiens coexisted in Europe, and thus at first it was attributed to the latter, but the discovery of a full skeleton from the former changed its attribution to Homo neanderthalensis. Some academics prefer to call it late Mousterian, and there is a debate on whether to consider it either a proper or a transitional industry, since chronologically it belongs to Middle Paleolithic but it shows characteristics of Upper Paleolithic industries.

=== Upper Paleolithic ===
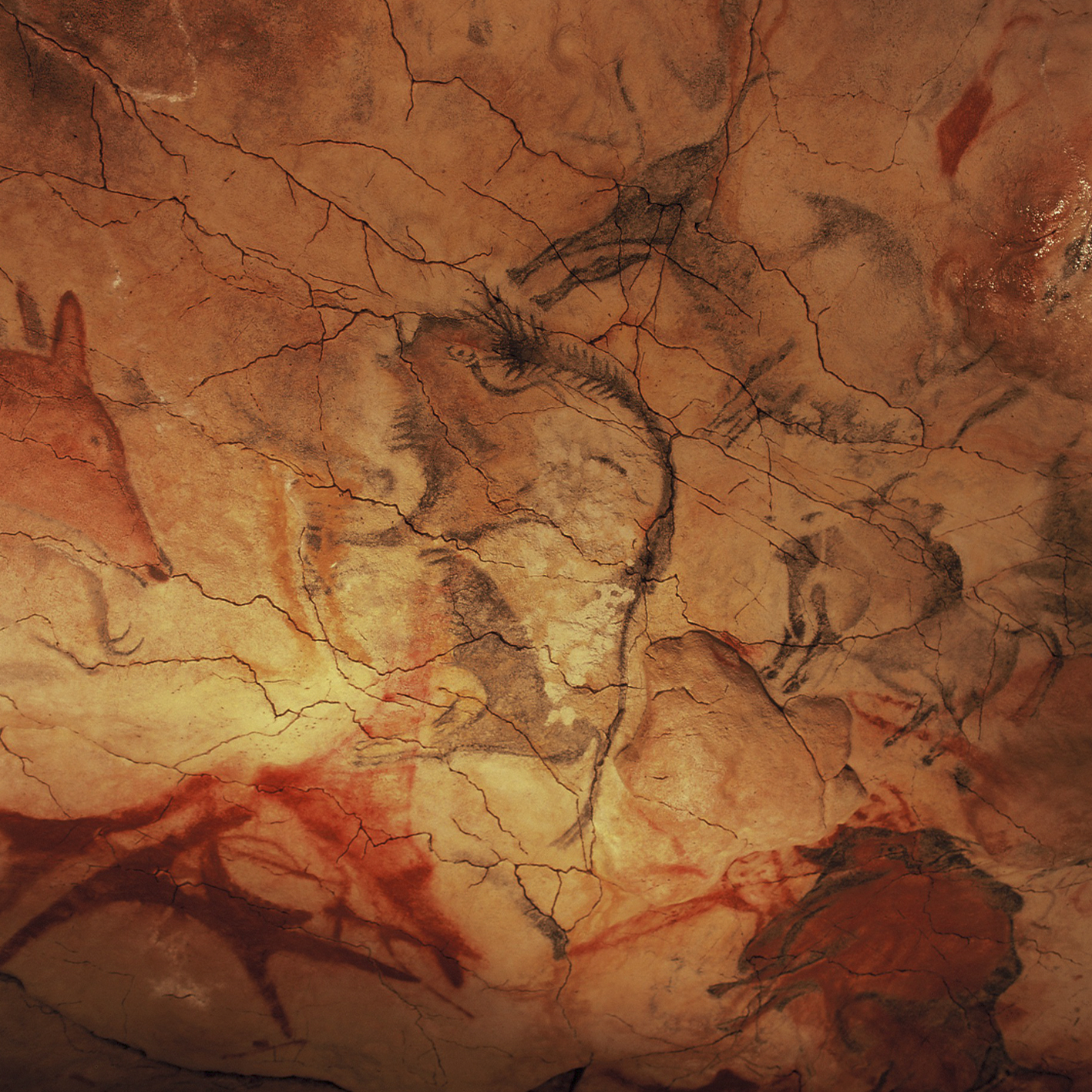
Paleolithic cave art

Upper Paleolithic (c. 40 - 11.5 ka ago) starts with the Aurignacian culture, which is mostly found in northern Iberia (current Asturias, Cantabria, Basque Country and Catalonia) in the beginning, and is the work of Homo sapiens. It later expands throughout all of the Iberian peninsula and is followed by the Gravettian. In Cantabria most Gravettian remains are found mixed with Aurignacian technology, thus it is considered "intrusive", in contrast with the Mediterranean area, where it probably means a real colonization. The first indications of modern human colonization of the interior and the west of the peninsula are found only in this cultural phase.

Because of the last glacial maximum, western Europe was isolated and developed the Solutrean culture, which shows its earliest appearances in Les Mallaetes (Valencia), with radiocarbon date 20,890 BP. In northern Iberia there are two markedly different tendencies in Asturias and the Vasco-Cantabrian area. Important sites are Altamira and Santimamiñe. The next phase is Magdalenian, even if in the Mediterranean area the Gravettian influence is still persistent. In Portugal there have been some findings north of Lisbon (Casa da Moura, Lapa do Suão).

=== Art ===
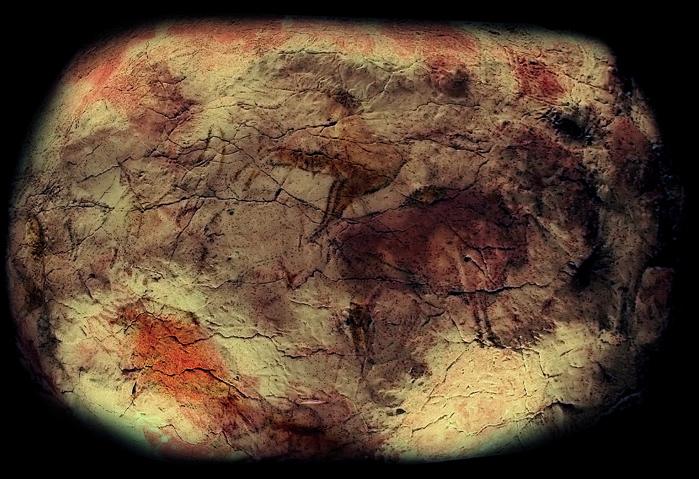
Altamira Cave ceiling

Iberia is host of impressive Paleolithic cave and rock art. Altamira cave is the most well-known example of the former, being a World Heritage Site since 1985. Côa Valley, in Portugal, and Siega Verde, in Spain, formed around tributaries into Douro, contain the best preserved rock art, forming together another World Heritage Site since 1998. Artistic manifestation is found most importantly in the northern Cantabrian area, where the earliest manifestations, for example the Caves of Monte Castillo are as old as Aurignacian times. The practice of this mural art increases in frequency in the Solutrean period, when the first animals are drawn, but it is not until the Magdalenian cultural phase when it becomes truly widespread, being found in almost every cave.

Most of the representations are of animals (bison, horse, deer, bull, reindeer, goat, bear, mammoth, moose) and are painted in ochre and black colors but there are exceptions and human-like forms as well as abstract drawings also appear in some sites. In the Mediterranean and interior areas, the presence of mural art is not so abundant but exists as well since the Solutrean. The monumental Côa Valley has petroglyphs dating up to 22,000 years ago. These document continuous human occupation from the end of the Paleolithic Age. Other examples include Chimachias, Los Casares or La Pasiega, or, in general, the caves principally in Cantabria (in Spain).

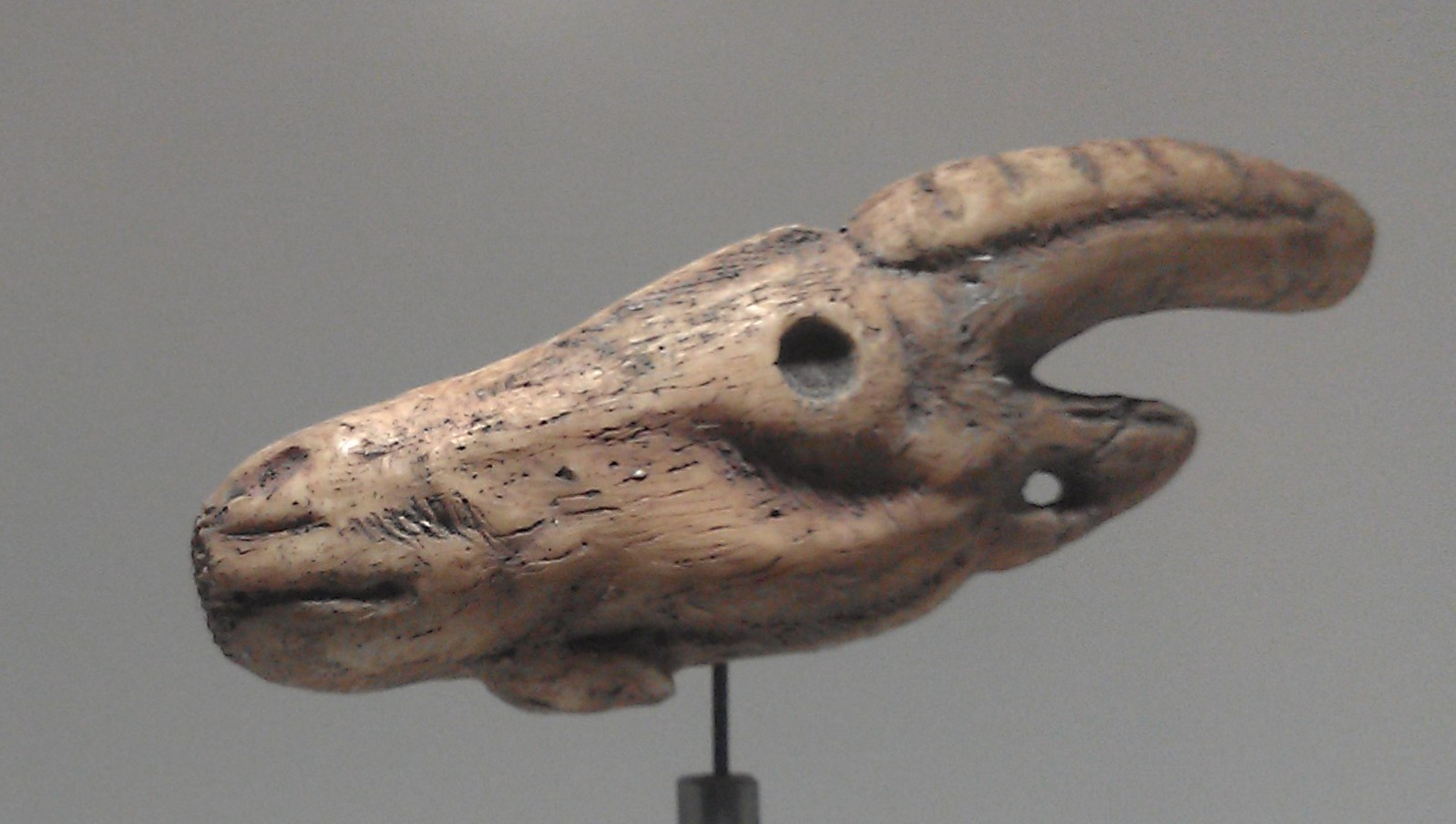
Paleolithic sculpture

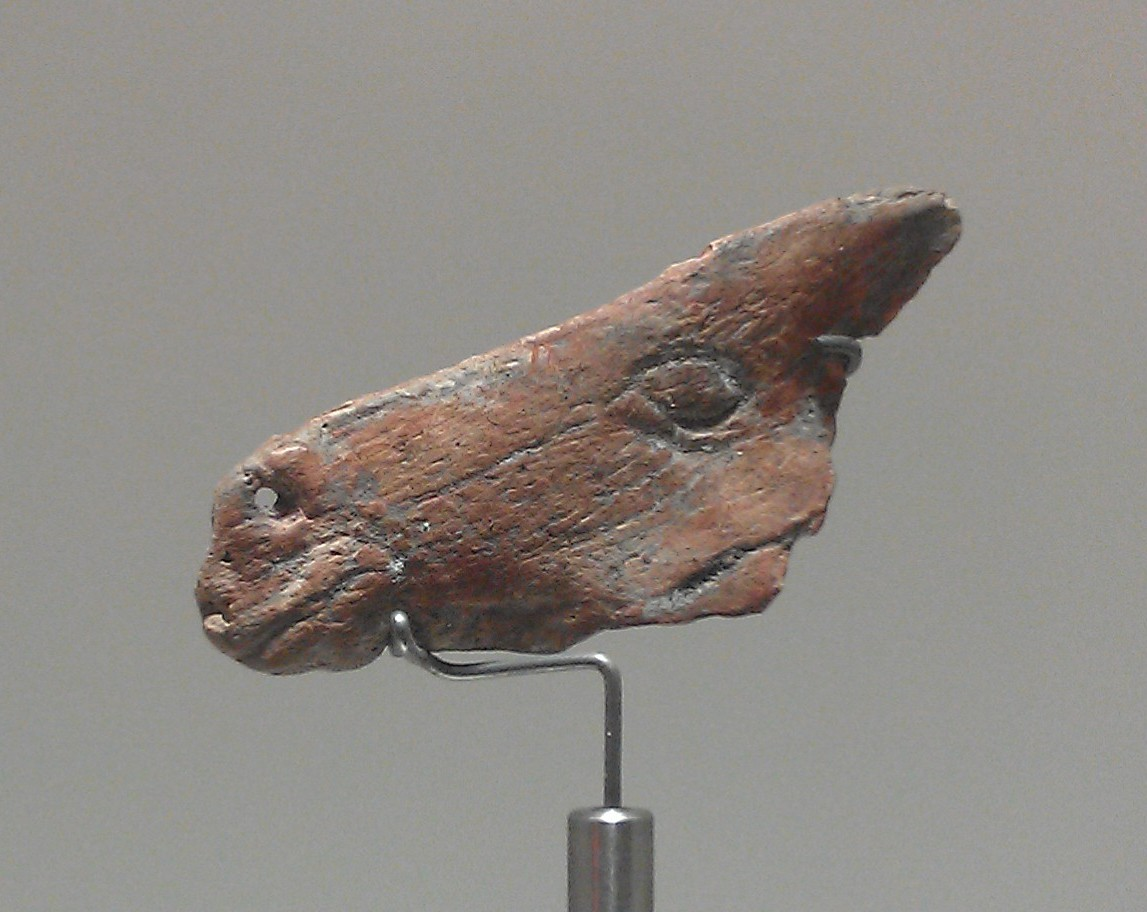
Paleolithic sculpture

== Epipaleolithic and Mesolithic ==
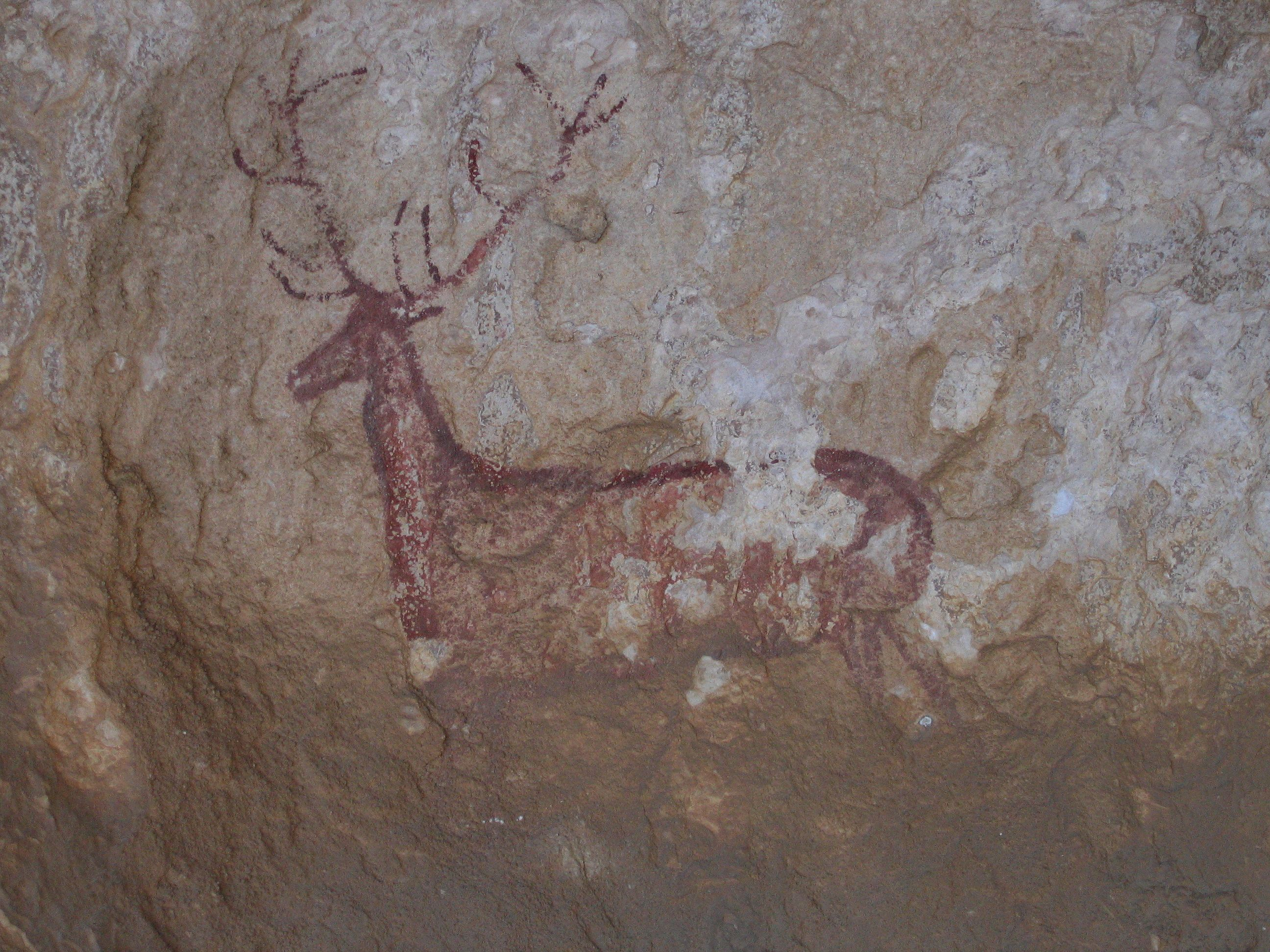
Chimiachas rock painting

Around 10,000 BC, an interstadial deglaciation called the Allerød Oscillation occurred, weakening the rigorous conditions of the last ice age. This climatic change also represents the end of the Upper Palaeolithic period, beginning the Epipaleolithic. Depending on the terminology preferred by any particular source, the Mesolithic begins after the Epipaleolithic, or includes it. If the Epipaleolithic is not included in it, the Mesolithic is a relatively brief period in Iberia.

As the climate became warmer, the late Magdalenian peoples of Iberia modified their technology and culture. The main techno-cultural change is the process of microlithization: the reduction of size of stone and bone tools, also found in other parts of the World. Also the cave sanctuaries seem to be abandoned and art becomes rarer and mostly done on portable objects, such as pebbles or tools.

It also implies changes in diet, as the megafauna virtually disappears when the steppe becomes woodlands. In this period, hunted animals are of smaller size, typically deer or wild goats, and seafood becomes an important part of the diet where available.

=== Azilian and Asturian ===
The first Epipaleolithic culture is the Azilian, also known as microlaminar microlithism in the Mediterranean. This culture is the local evolution of Magdalenian, parallel to other regional derivatives found in Central and Northern Europe. Originally found in the old Magdalenian territory of Vasco-Cantabria and the wider Franco-Cantabrian region, Azilian-style culture eventually expanded to parts of Mediterranean Iberia as well. It reflected a much warmer climate, leading to thick woodlands, and the replacement of large herd animals with smaller and more elusive forest-dwellers.

An archetypical Azilian site in the Iberian peninsula is Zatoya (Navarre), where it is difficult to discern the early Azilian elements from those of late Magdalenian (this transition dated to 11,760 BP). Full Azilian in the same site is dated to 8,150 BP, followed by appearance of geometric elements at a later date, that continue until the arrival of pottery (subneolithic stage).

In the Mediterranean area, virtually this same material culture is often named microlaminar microlithism because it lacks of the bone industry typical of Franco-Cantabrian Azilian. It is found in parts of Catalonia, Valencian Community, Murcia and Mediterranean Andalusia. It has been dated in Les Mallaetes at 10,370 BP.

The Asturian culture was a successor to the Azilian, moved slightly to the west, whose distinctive tool was a pick-axe for picking limpets off rocks.

=== Geometrical microlithism ===
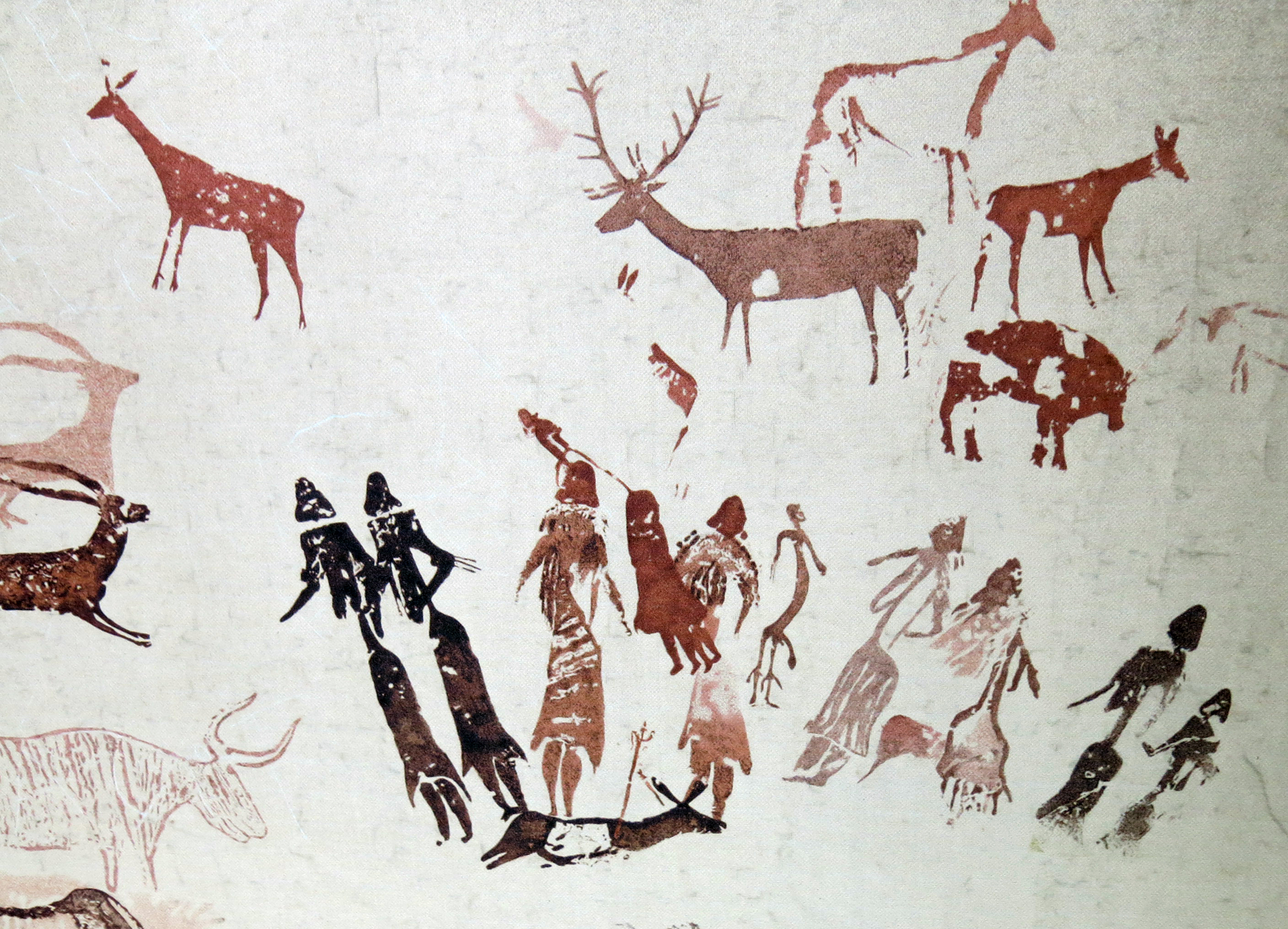
The Dance of Cogul, tracing by Henri Breuil

In the late phases of the Epipaleolithic a new trend arrives from the north: the geometrical microlithism, directly related to Sauveterrian and Tardenoisian cultures of the Rhine-Danube region.

While in the Franco-Cantabrian region it has a minor impact, not altering the Azilian culture substantially, in Mediterranean Iberia and Portugal its arrival is more noticeable. The Mediterranean geometrical microlithism has two facies:

- The Filador facies is directly related to French Sauveterrian and is found in Catalonia, north of the Ebro river.
- The Cocina facies is more widespread and, in many sites (Málaga, Spain), shows a strong dependence of fishing and seafood gathering. The Portuguese sites (south of the Tagus, Muge group) have given dates of c.7350 .

=== Art ===
The rock art found at over 700 sites along the eastern side of Iberia is the most advanced and widespread surviving from this period, certainly in Europe, and arguably in the world. It is strikingly different from the Upper Palaeolithic art found along the northern coast, with narrative scenes with large numbers of small sketchily painted human figures, rather than the superbly observed individual animal figures that characterise the earlier period.

When it appears in the same scene as animals, the human figure runs towards them. The most common scenes by far are of hunting, and there are scenes of battle and dancing, and possibly agricultural tasks and managing domesticated animals. In some scenes gathering honey is shown, most famously at Cuevas de la Araña en Bicorp (illustrated below). Humans are naked from the waist up, but women have skirts and men sometimes skirts or gaiters or trousers of some sort, and headdresses and masks are sometimes seen, which may indicate rank or status.

== Neolithic ==
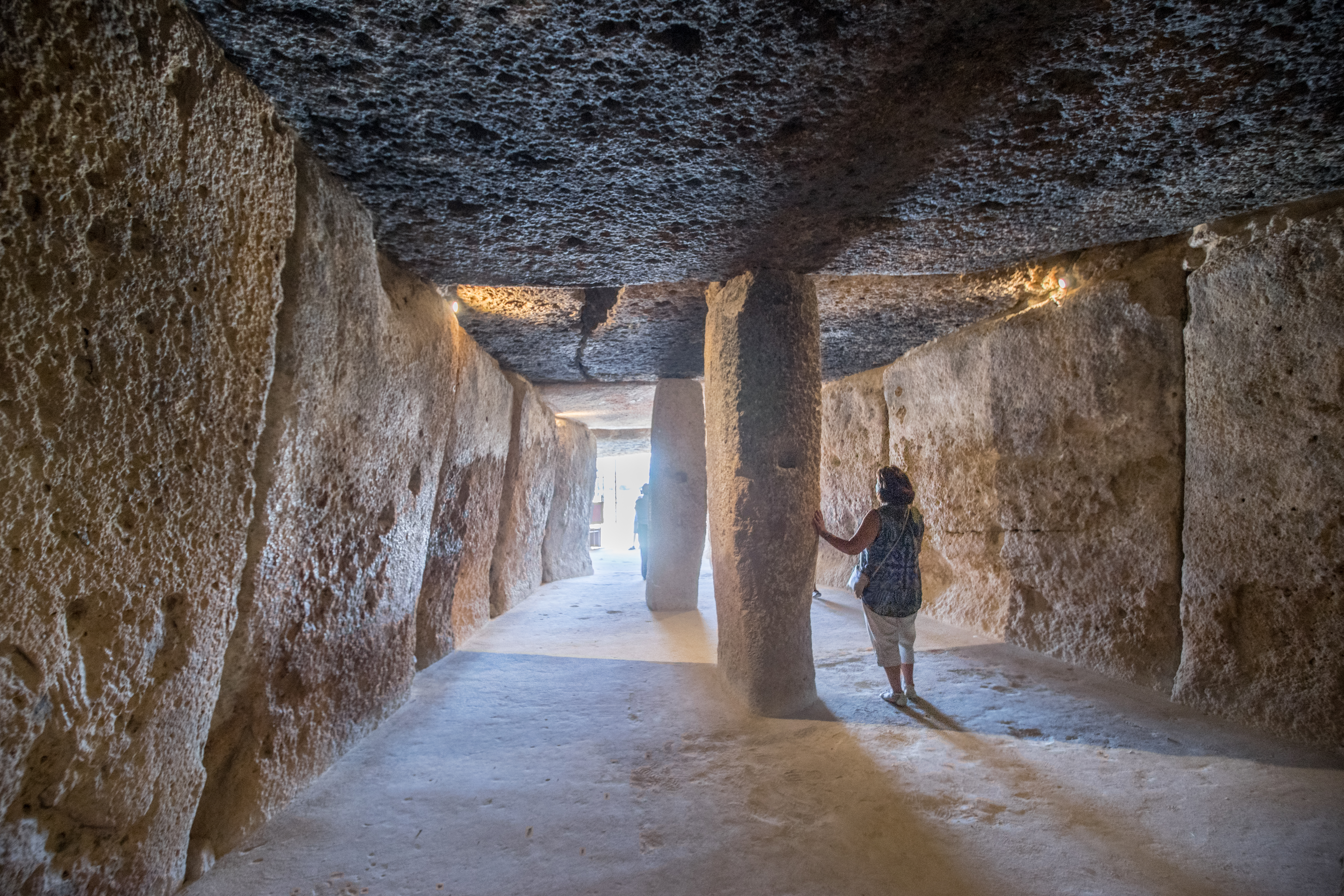
Dolmen of Menga, Antequera Dolmens Site, c. 3700 BC.

In the 6th millennium BC, Andalusia experienced the arrival of the first agriculturalists. Their origin is uncertain, but they arrived with already developed crops (cereals and legumes). The presence of domestic animals instead was unlikely, as only pig and rabbit remains have been found, and these could potentially belong to wild animals. They also consumed large amounts of olives, but it's uncertain too as to whether this tree was cultivated or merely harvested in its wild form. There is an abundance of La Almagra style pottery found, with their style being quite variegated.

The Andalusian Neolithic also influenced other areas, notably Southern Portugal, where, soon after the arrival of agriculture, the first dolmen tombs begin to be built c. 4800 BC, being possibly the oldest of their kind anywhere.

In c. 5700 BC, Cardium pottery Neolithic culture (also known as Mediterranean Neolithic) arrived to Eastern Iberia. While some remains of this culture have been found as far west as Portugal, its distribution is essentially Mediterranean (Catalonia, Valencian region, Ebro valley, Balearic islands).

The interior and the northern coastal areas remained largely marginal as agriculture spread through the peninsula. In most cases it would only arrive during a very late phase of the Neolithic or even into the Chalcolithic age, together with Megalithism.

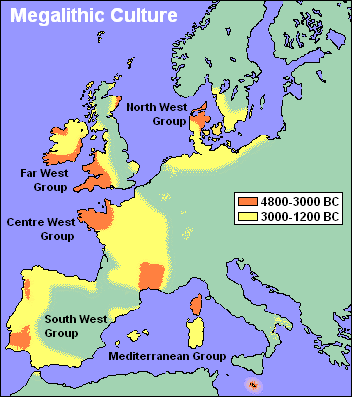
An interpretation of the development of the European Megalithic Culture

The location of Perdigões, in Reguengos de Monsaraz, is thought to have been an important location. Twenty small ivory statues dating to 4,500 years BP have been discovered there since 2011. It has constructions including a necropolis, dating back to about 5,500 years. Outside of the vicinity of Perdigões, there is also a cromlech. The Almendres Cromlech site in Évora, has megaliths from the late 6th to the early 3rd millennium BC. The Anta Grande do Zambujeiro, also in Évora, is dated to between 4000 and 3000 BC. The Antequera Dolmens date from after c. 3700 BC. The Dolmen of Cunha Baixa, in Mangualde Municipality, is dated between 3000 and 2500 BC. The Cave of Salemas was used as a burial ground during the Neolithic.

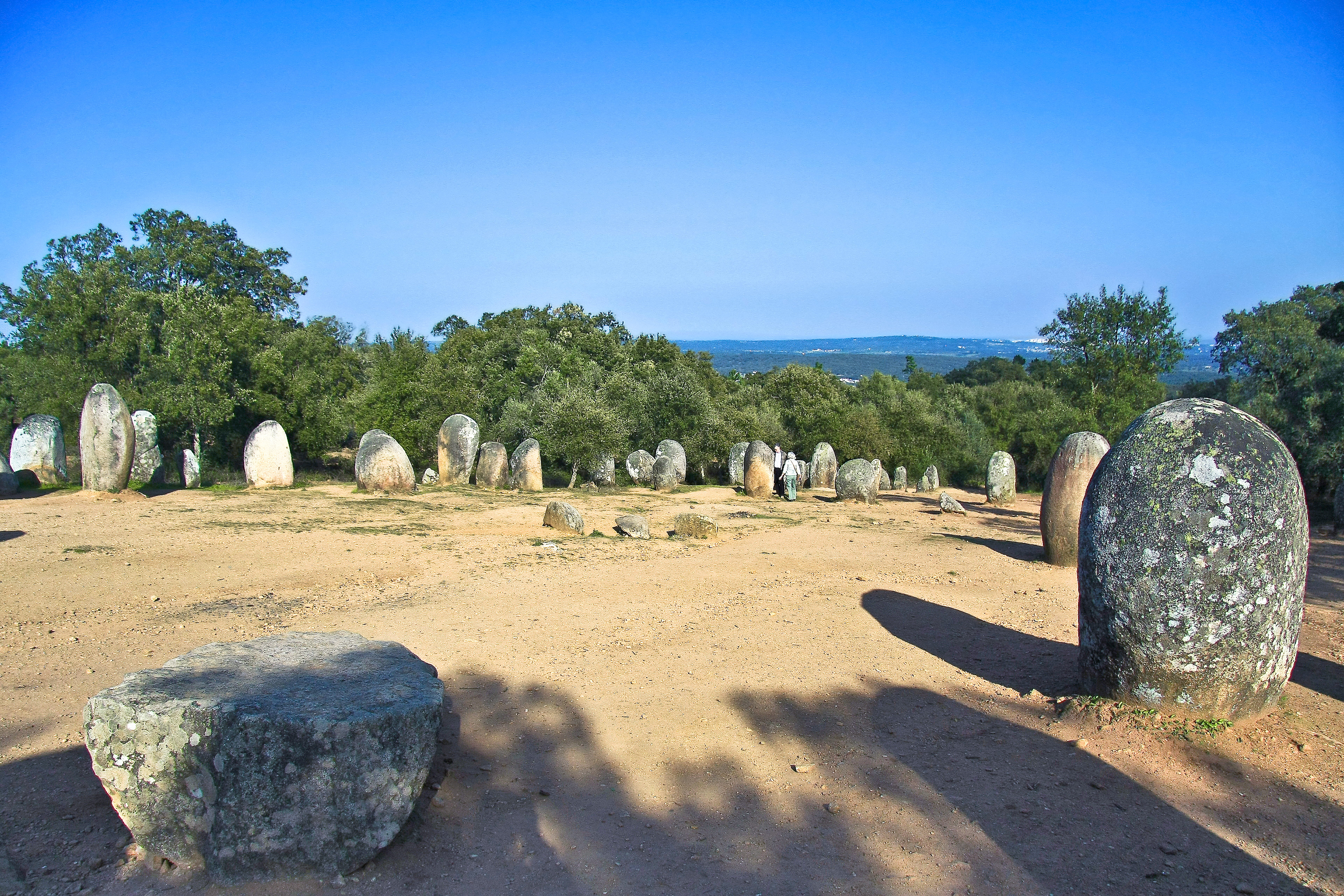
Almendres Cromlech, Portugal, 6000–4000 BC

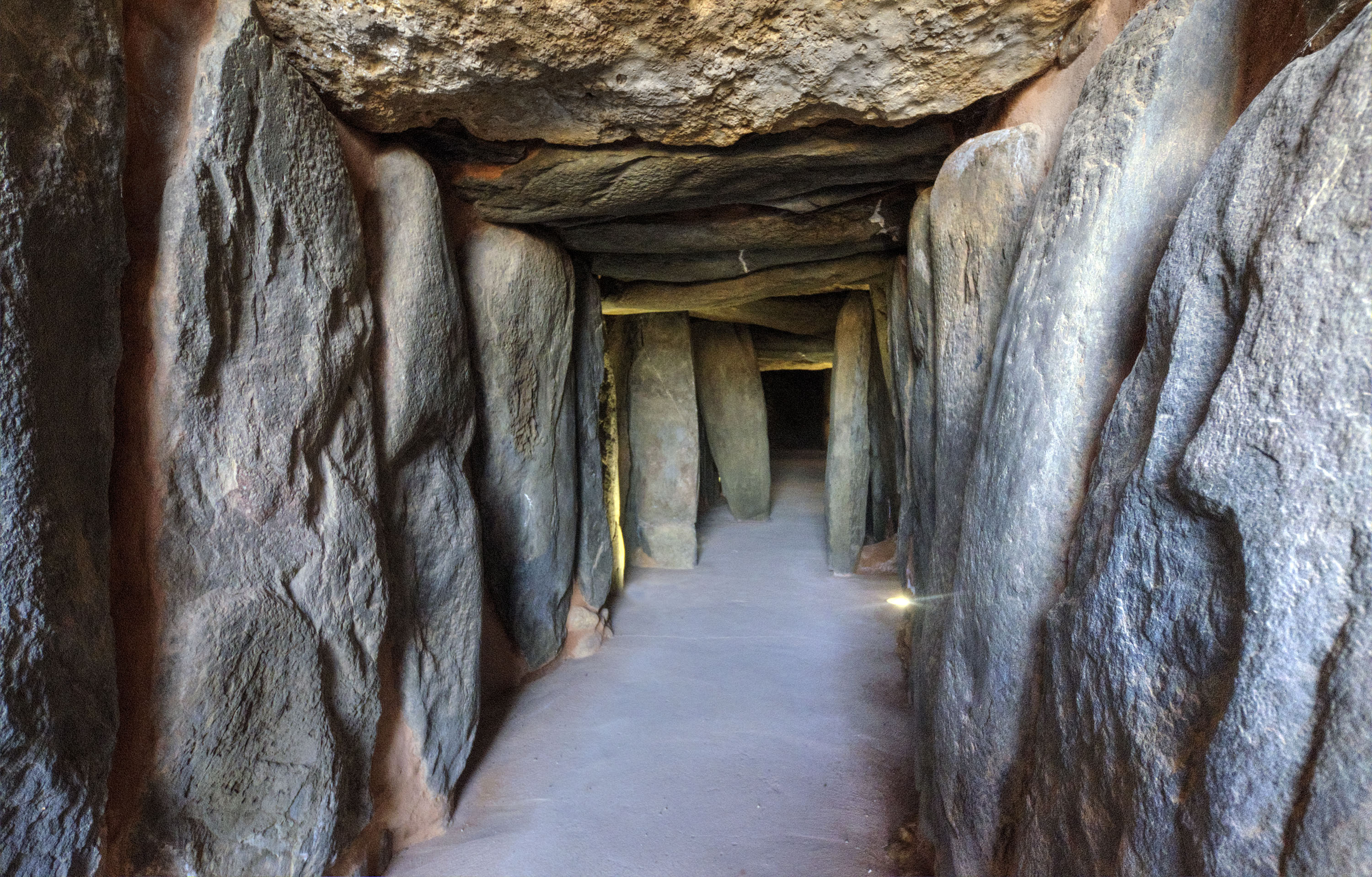
Dolmen de Soto, Spain, c. 3000 BC

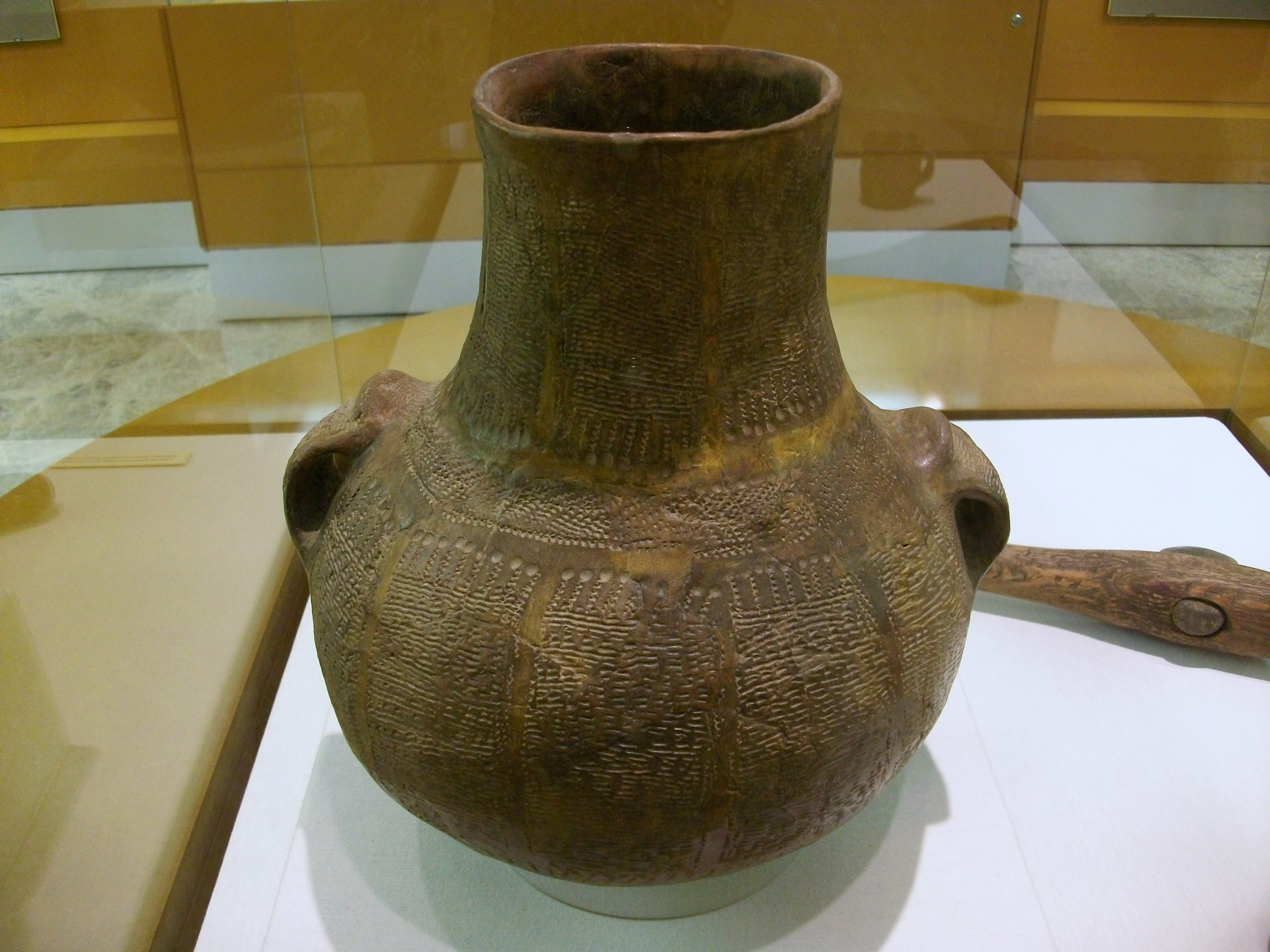
Cardium pottery, Spain, c. 5500 BC

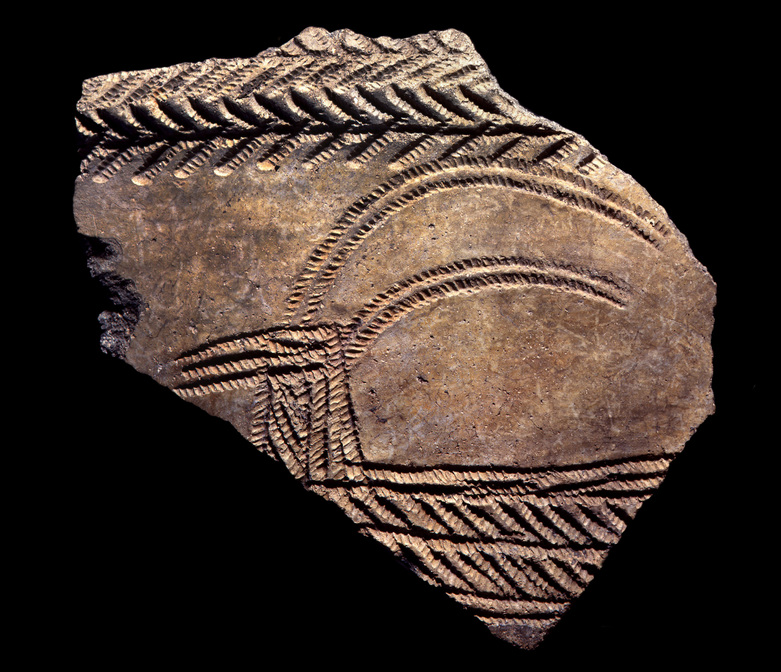
Cardium pottery fragment

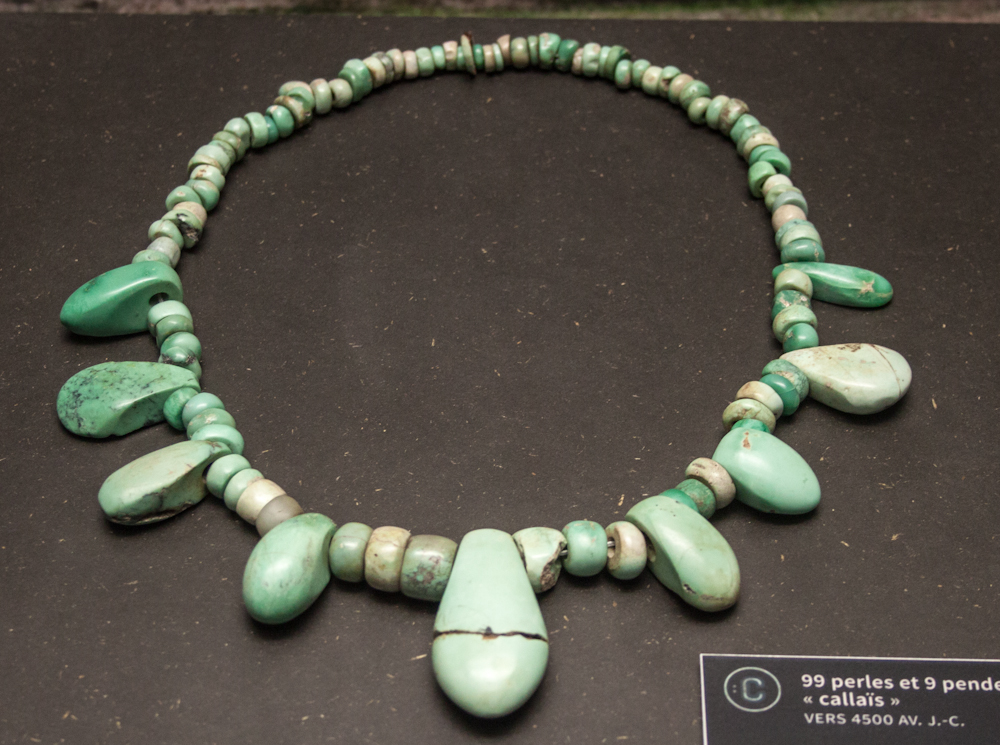
Callaïs jewellery from southwest Iberia, found at Carnac in northwest France. c. 4500 BC

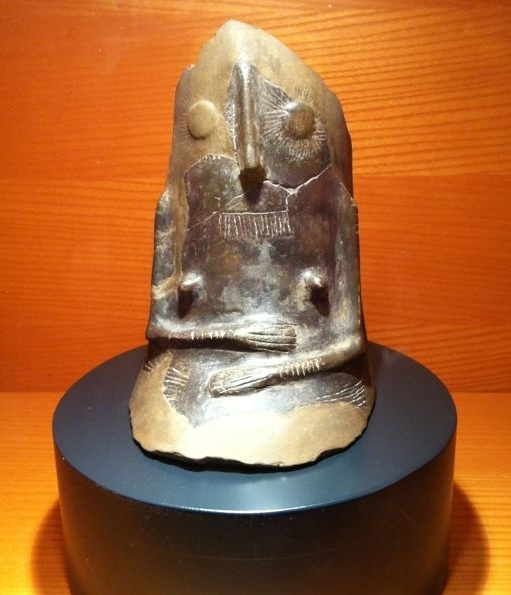
Venus de Gavà, Sepulcres de Fossa culture

== Chalcolithic ==
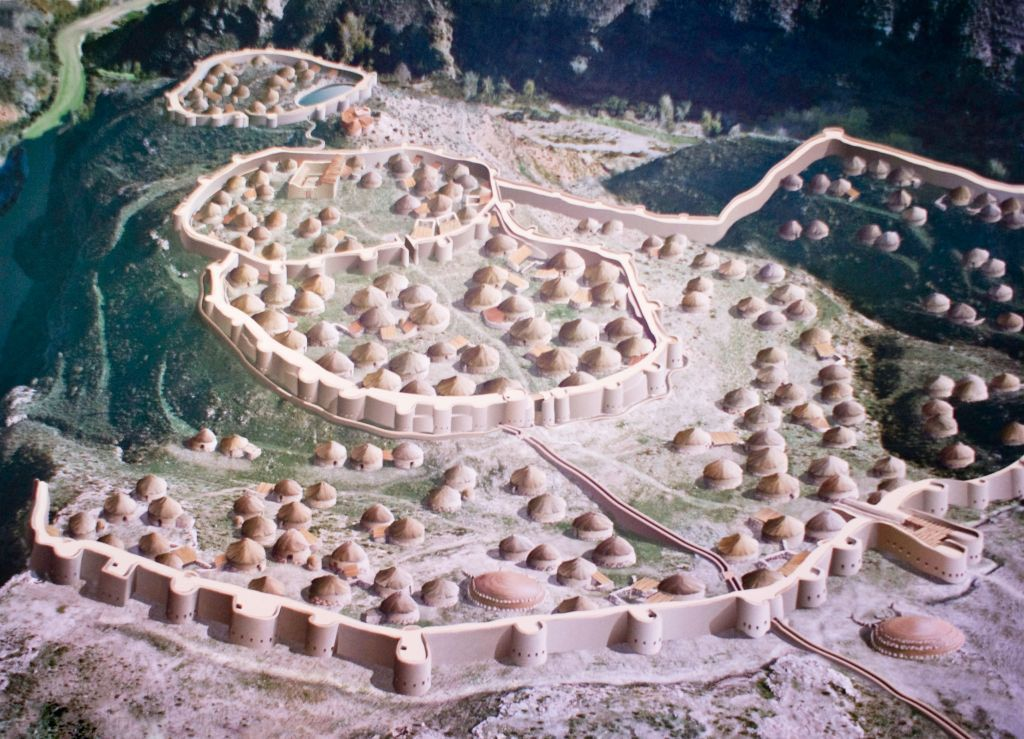
A model of the prehistoric town of Los Millares, with its walls. (Andalusia, Spain)

The Chalcolithic or Copper Age is the earliest phase of metallurgy. Copper, silver and gold started to be worked then, though these soft metals could hardly replace stone tools for most purposes. The Chalcolithic is also a period of increased social complexity and stratification and, in the case of Iberia, that of the rise of the first civilizations and of extensive exchange networks that would reach to the Baltic and Africa. The conventional date for the beginning of Chalcolithic in Iberia is c. 3200 BC. In the following centuries, especially in the south of the peninsula, metal goods, often decorative or ritual, become increasingly common. Additionally there is an increased evidence of exchanges with areas far away: amber from the Baltic and ivory and ostrich-egg products from Northern Africa. A notable example in that regard is the Ivory Lady from Tholos de Montelirio.

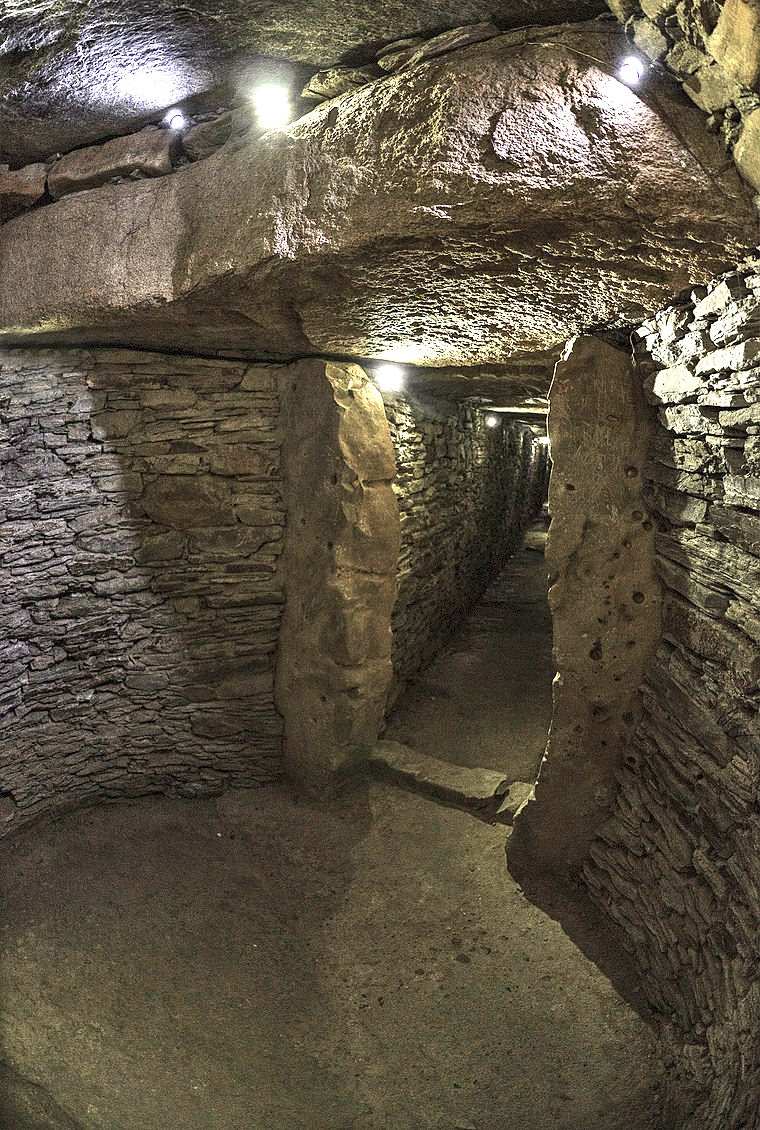
Dolmen de la Pastora, c. 3rd millennium BC.

The Bell Beaker culture was present in Iberia during the Chalcolithic. Gordon Childe interpreted the presence of its characteristic artefact as the intrusion of "missionaries" expanding from Iberia along the Atlantic coast, spreading knowledge of Mediterranean copper metallurgy. Stephen Shennan interpreted their artefacts as belonging to a mobile cultural elite imposing itself over the indigenous substrate populations. Similarly, Sangmeister (1972) interpreted the "Beaker folk" (Glockenbecherleute) as small groups of highly mobile traders and artisans. Christian Strahm (1995) used the term "Bell Beaker phenomenon" (Glockenbecher-Phänomen) as a compromise in order to avoid the term "culture".

The Bell Beaker artefacts at least in their early phase are not distributed across a contiguous areal as is usual for archaeological cultures, but are found in insular concentrations scattered across Europe. Their presence is not associated with a characteristic type of architecture or of burial customs. However, the Bell Beaker culture does appear to coalesce into a coherent archaeological culture in its later phase.

More recent analyses of the "Beaker phenomenon", published since the 2000s, have persisted in describing the origin of the "Beaker phenomenon" as arising from a synthesis of elements, representing "an idea and style uniting different regions with different cultural traditions and background.

"Archaeogenetics studies of the 2010s have been able to resolve the "migrationist vs. diffusionist" question to some extent. The study by Olalde et al. (2017) found only "limited genetic affinity" between individuals associated with the Beaker complex in Iberia and in Central Europe, suggesting that migration played a limited role in its early spread from Iberia. However, the same study found that the further dissemination of the mature Beaker complex was very strongly linked to migration. The spread and fluidity of the Beaker culture back and forth between the Rhine and its origin source in the peninsula may have introduced high levels of steppe-related ancestry, resulting in a near-complete transformation of the local gene pool within a few centuries, to the point of replacement of about 90% of the local Mesolithic-Neolithic patrilineal lineages.

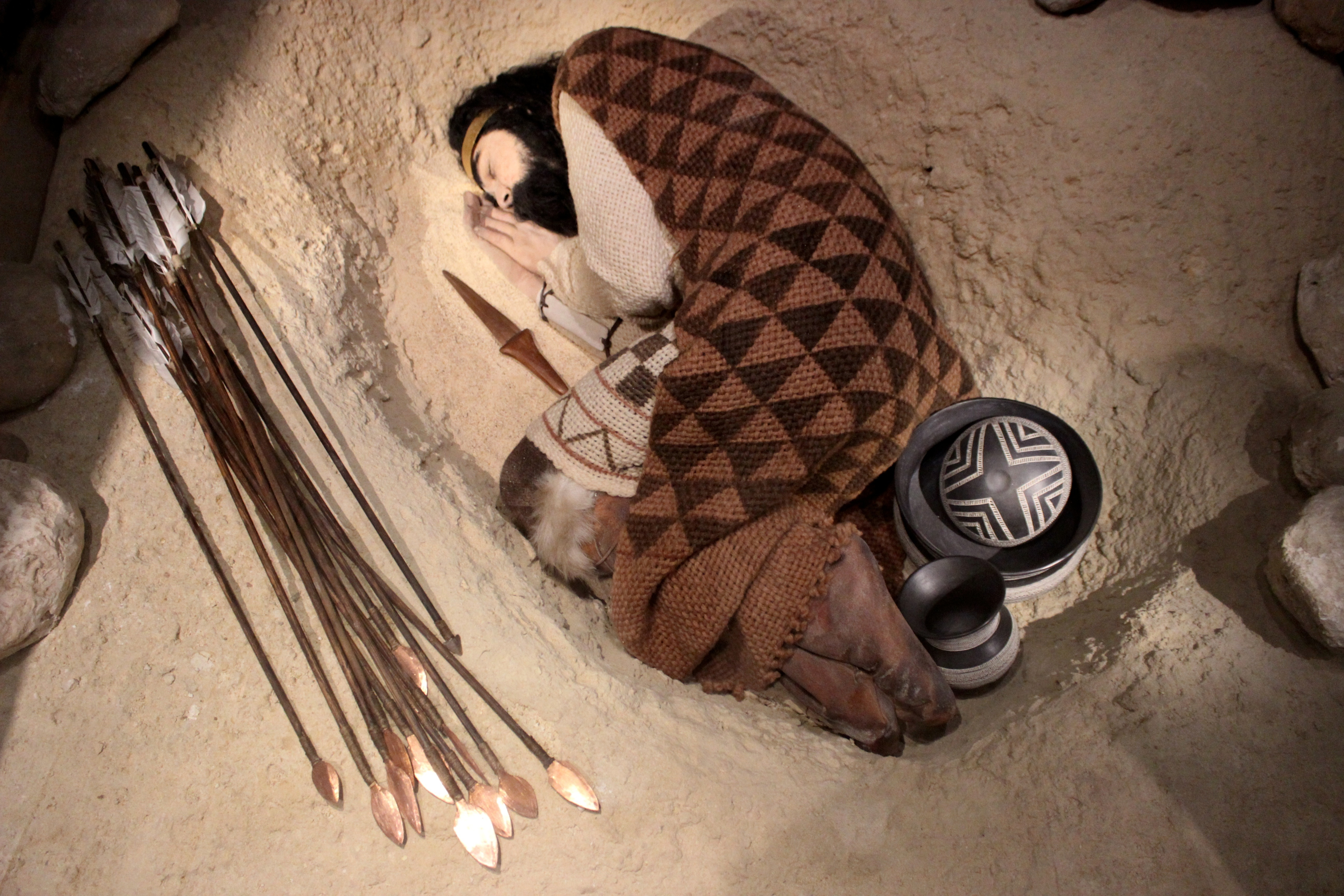
Bell Beaker burial

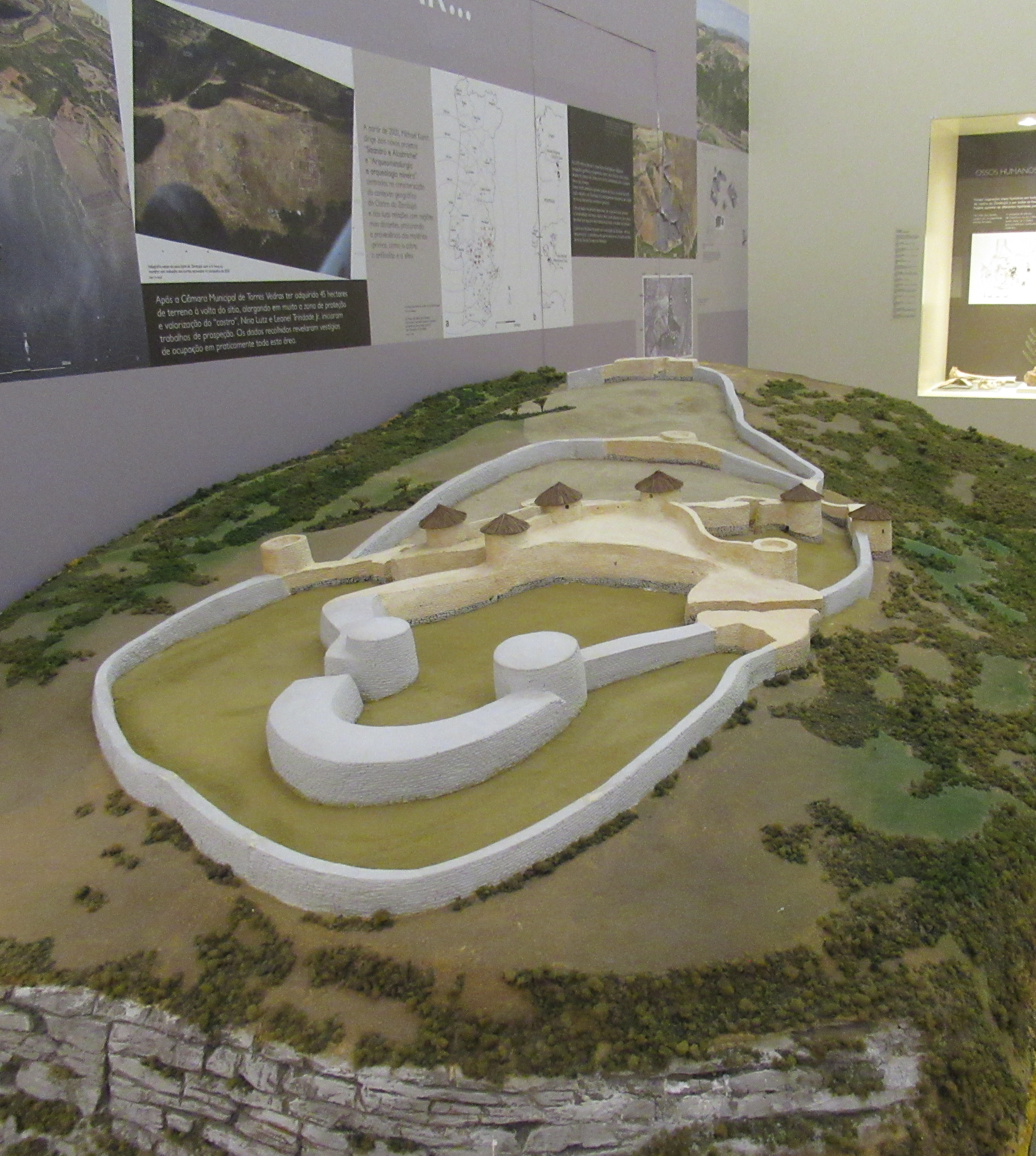
Castro of Zambujal

The origin of the "Bell Beaker" artefact itself has been traced to the early 3rd millennium. The earliest examples of the "maritime" Bell Beaker design have been found at the Tagus estuary in Portugal, radiocarbon dated to c. the 28th century BC. The inspiration for the Maritime Bell Beaker is argued to have been the small and earlier Copoz beakers that have impressed decoration and which are found widely around the Tagus estuary in Portugal. Turek has recorded late Neolithic precursors in northern Africa, arguing the Maritime style emerged as a result of seaborne contacts between Iberia and Morocco in the first half of the third millennium BC. In only a few centuries of their maritime spread, by 2600 BC. they had reached the rich lower Rhine estuary and further upstream into Bohemia and beyond the Elbe where they merged with Corded Ware culture, as also in the French coast of Provence and upstream the Rhone into the Alps and Danube.

Important Chalcolithic settlements in Iberia include Valencina de la Concepción, Marroquíes Bajos and Los Millares.

A significant Chalcolithic archeological site in Portugal is the Castro of Vila Nova de São Pedro. Other settlements from this period include Pedra do Ouro and the Castro of Zambujal. Megaliths were created during this period, having started earlier, during the late 5th, and lasting until the early 2nd millennium BC. The Castelo Velho de Freixo de Numão, in Vila Nova de Foz Côa Municipality, was populated from about 3000 to 1300 BC. The Cerro do Castelo de Santa Justa, in Alcoutim, is dated to the 3rd millennium BC, between 2400 and 1900 BC.

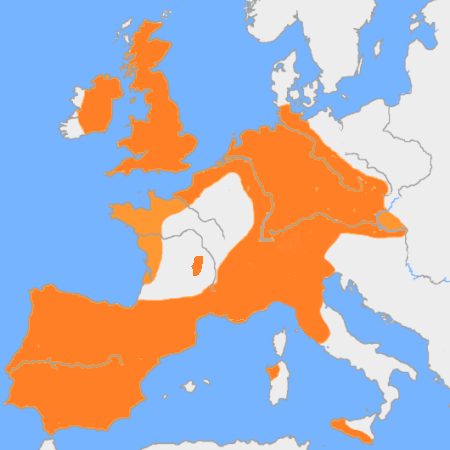
Extent of the Beaker culture

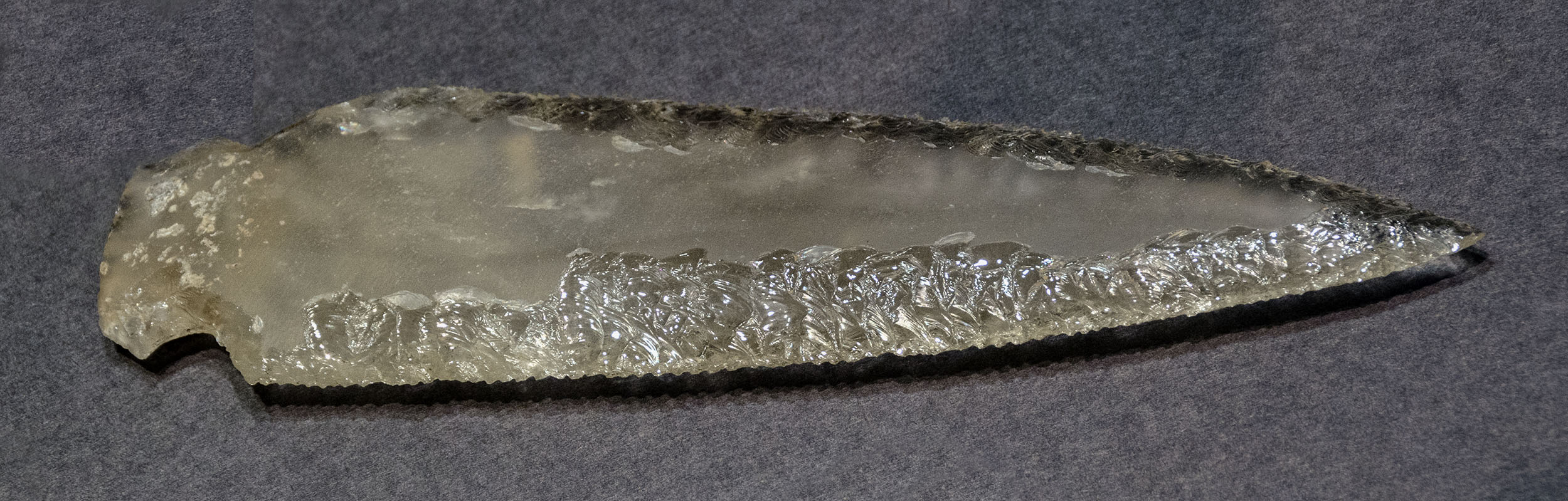
Crystal dagger blade from the Tholos de Montelirio in Valencina de la Concepción, 3000-2500 BC

It is also the period of the great expansion of megalithism, with its associated collective burial practices. In the early Chalcolithic period this cultural phenomenon, maybe of religious undertones, expands along the Atlantic regions and also through the south of the peninsula (additionally it's also found in virtually all European Atlantic regions). In contrast, most of the interior and the Mediterranean regions remain refractary to this phenomenon.

Another phenomenon found in the early chalcolithic is the development of new types of funerary monuments: tholoi and artificial caves. These are only found in the more developed areas: southern Iberia, from the Tagus estuary to Almería, and SE France.

From c. 3000 BC, urban communities began to appear, again especially in the south. The most important ones are Los Millares in SE Spain and Zambujal (belonging to Vila Nova de São Pedro culture) in Portuguese Estremadura, that can well be called civilizations, even if they lack of the literary component.

It is very unclear if any cultural influence originated in the Eastern Mediterranean (Cyprus?) could have sparked these civilizations. On one side the tholos does have a precedent in that area (even if not used yet as tomb) but on the other there is no material evidence of any exchange between the Eastern and Western Mediterranean, in contrast with the abundance of goods imported from Northern Europe and Africa.

Since c. 2150 BC, the Bell Beaker culture intrudes in Chalcolithic Iberia. After the early Corded style beaker, of quite clear Central European origin, the peninsula begins producing its own types of Bell Beaker pottery. Most important is the Maritime or International style that, associated especially with Megalithism, is for some centuries abundant in all the peninsula and southern France.

Since c. 1900 BC, the Bell Beaker phenomenon in Iberia shows a regionalization, with different styles being produced in the various regions: Palmela type in Portugal, Continental type in the plateau and Almerian type in Los Millares, among others.

Like in other parts of Europe, the Bell Beaker phenomenon (speculated to be of trading or maybe religious nature) does not significantly alter the cultures it inserts itself in. Instead the cultural contexts that existed previously continue basically unchanged by its presence.

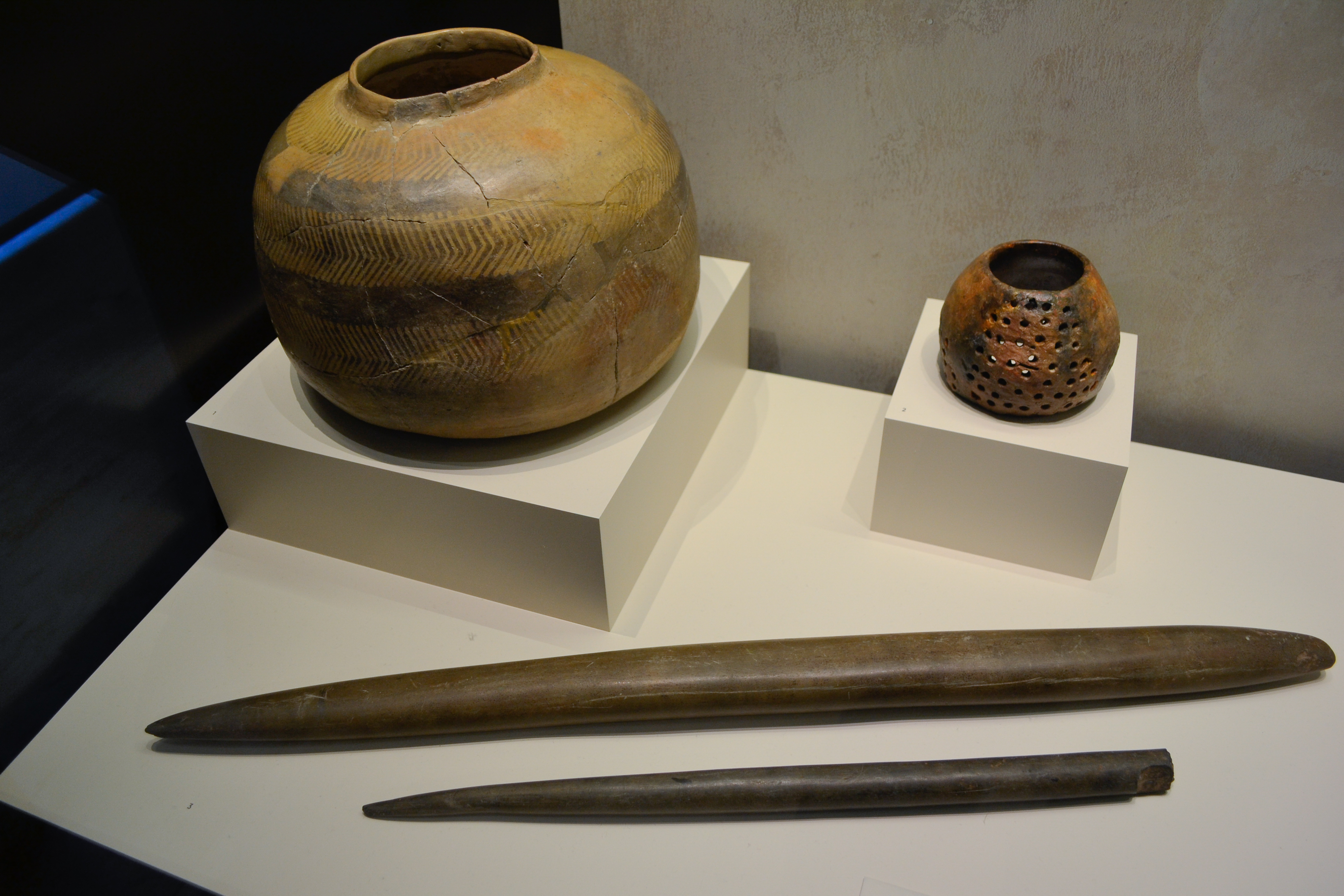
Ceramic vessels and tools

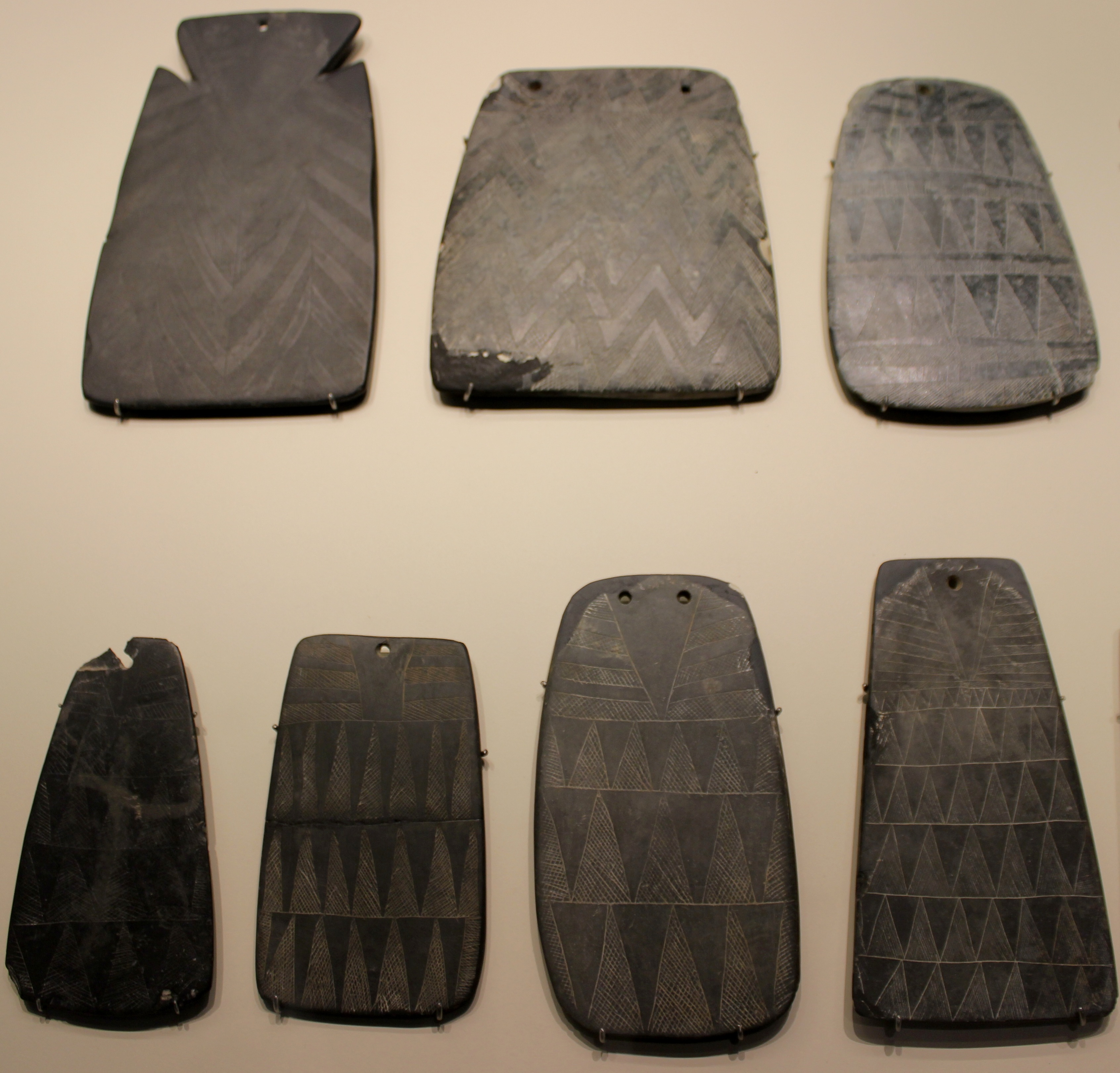
Stone idols, c. 3500-2700 BC.

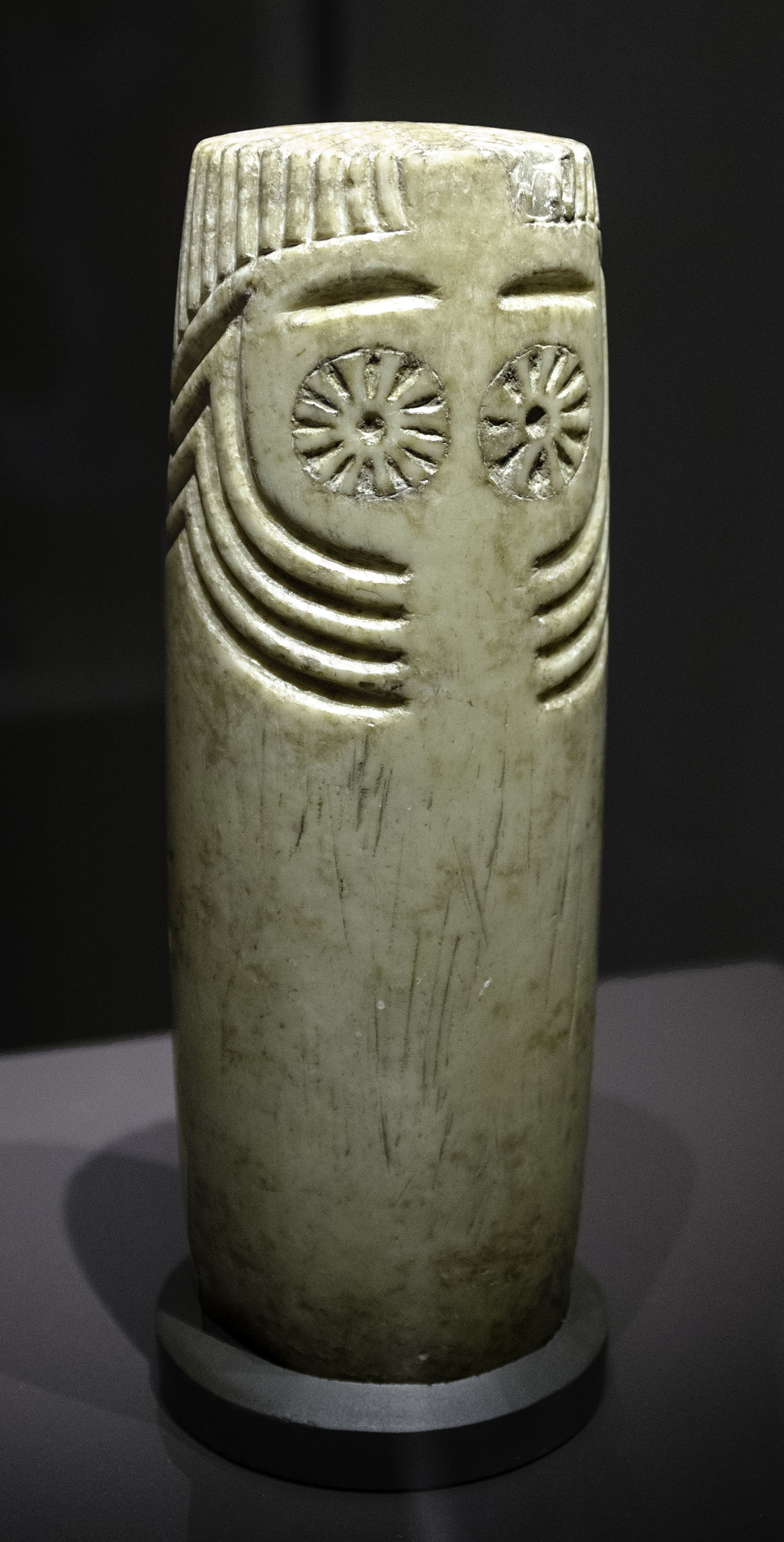
Albaster idol from Extremadura, c. 3500-2700 BC

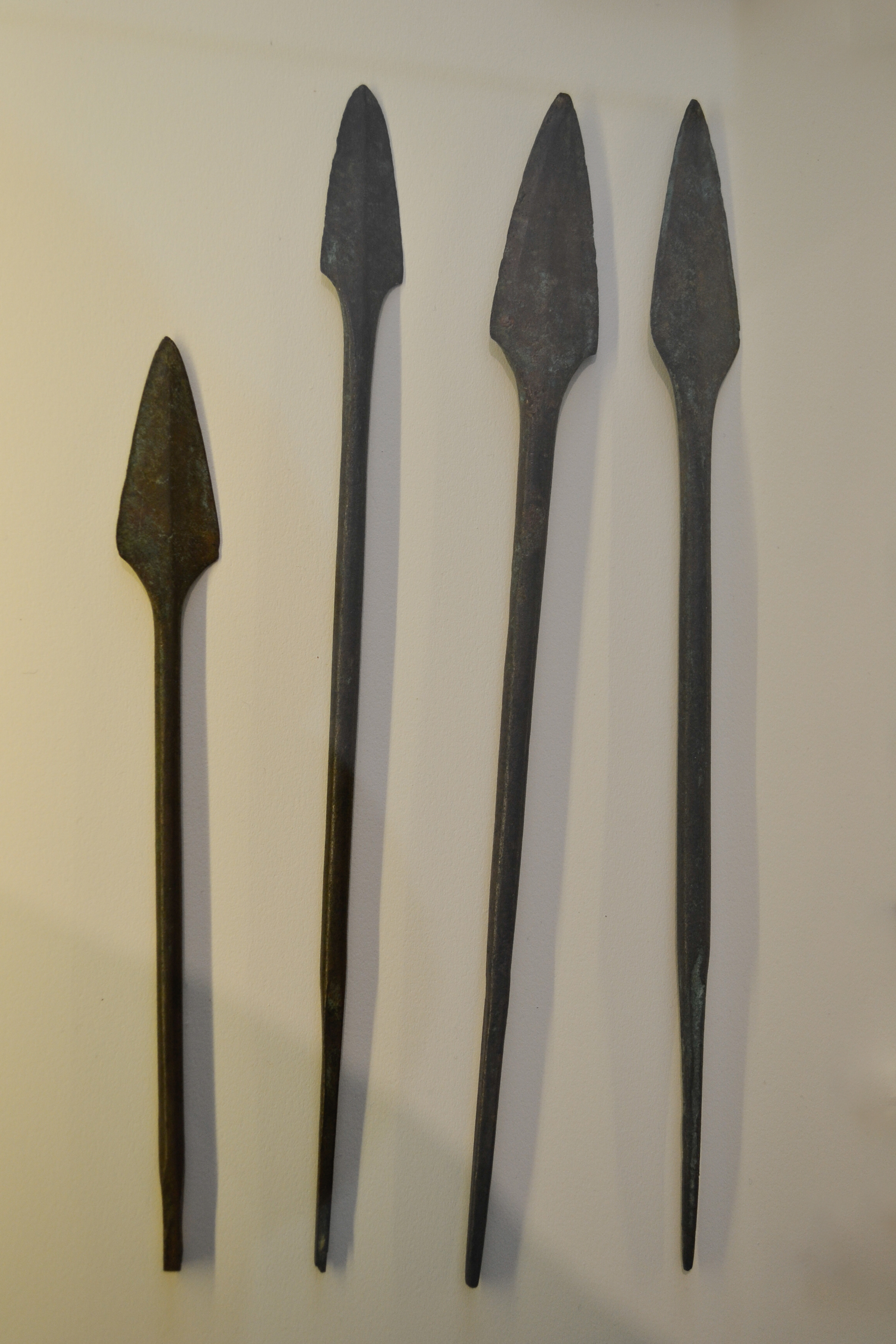
Copper javelins, Dolmen de la Pastora

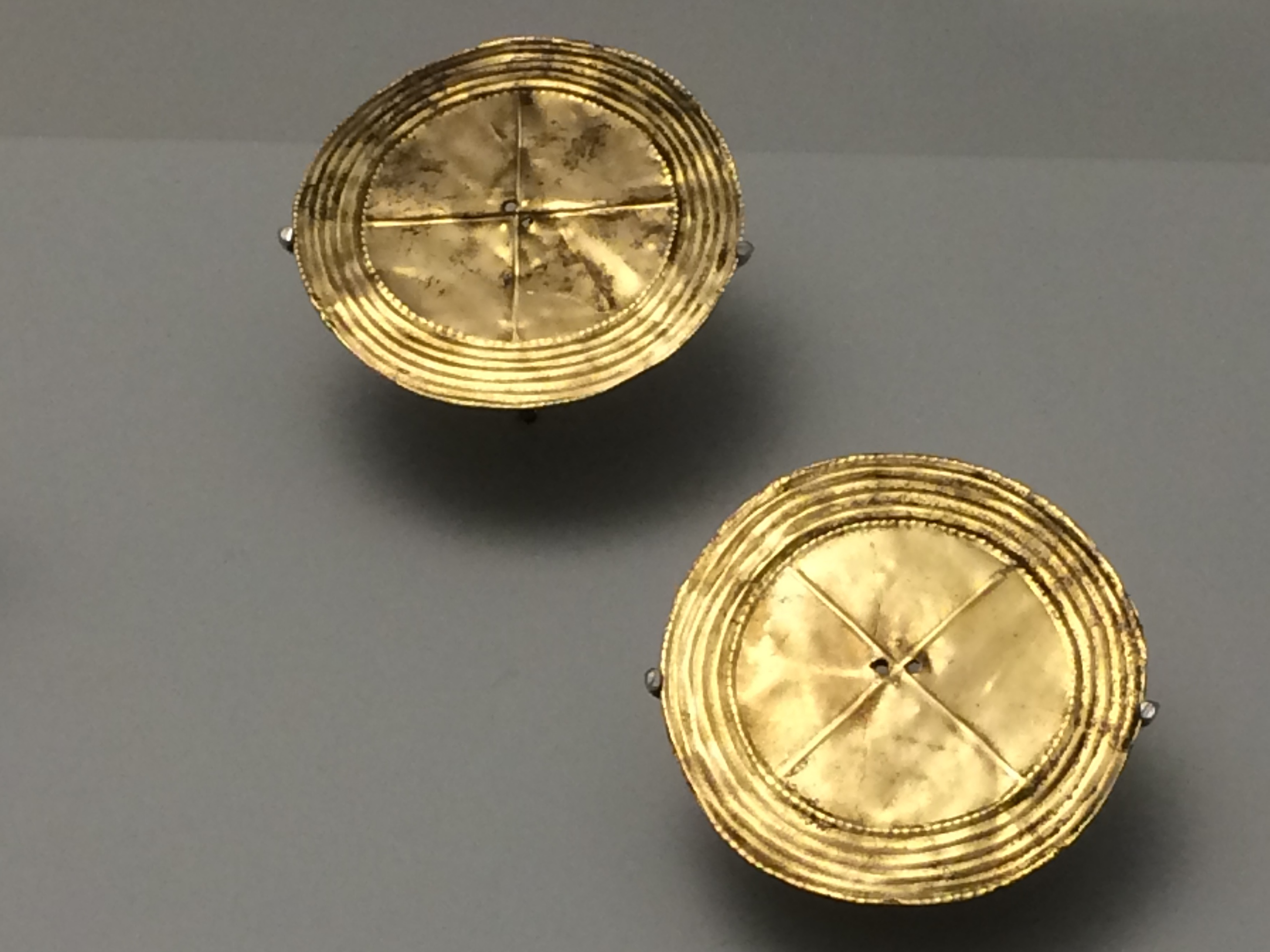
Gold discs, Bell Beaker culture

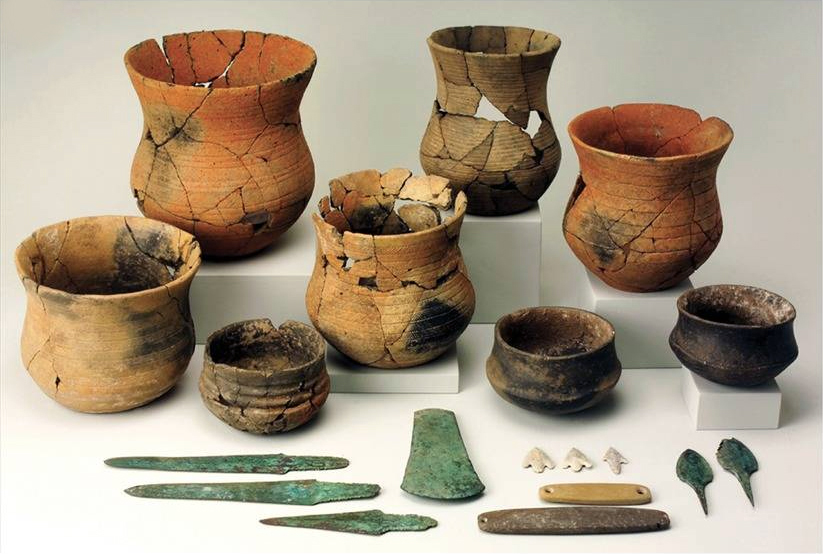
Bell Beaker artefacts

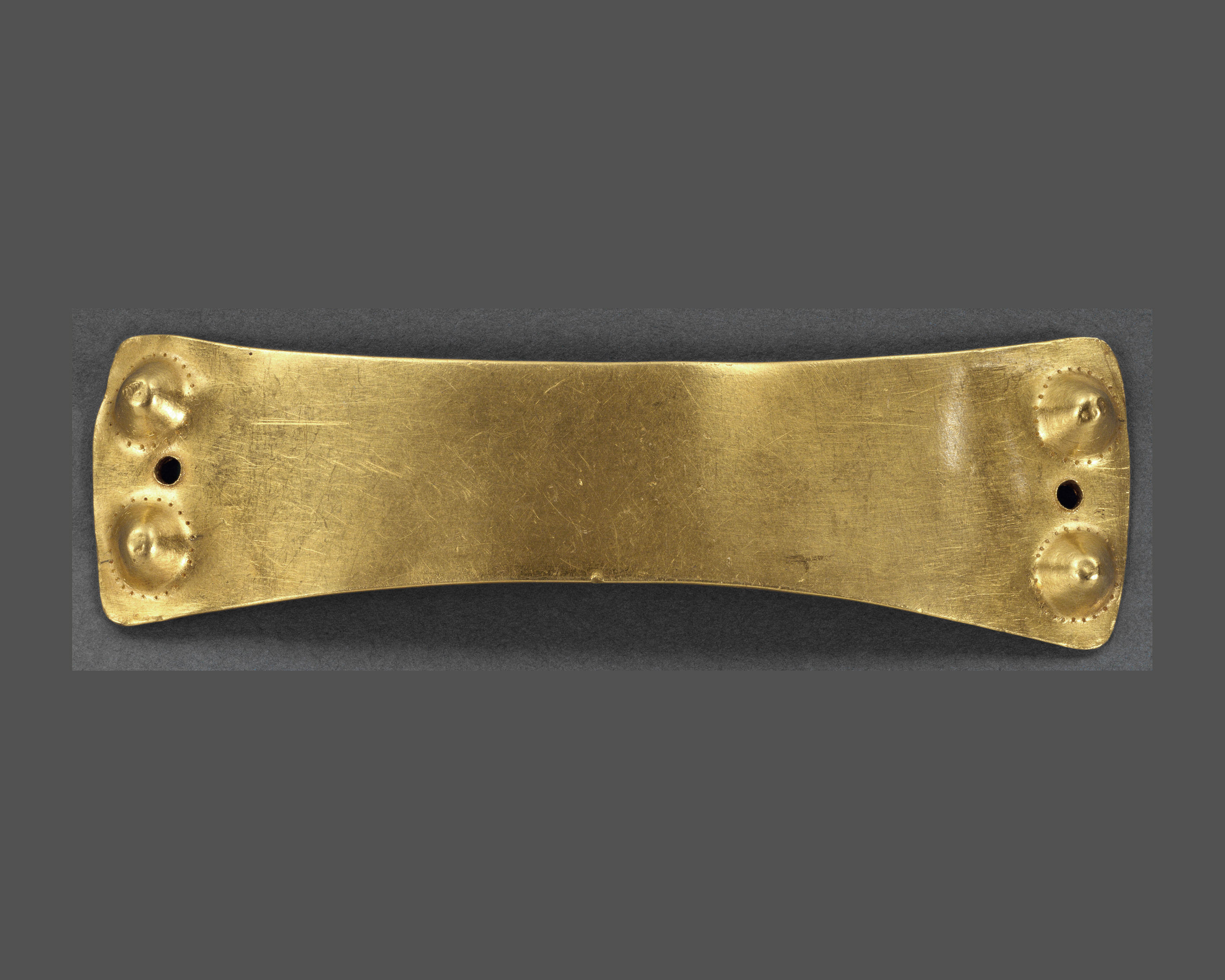
Gold wristguard from Vila Nova de Cerveira, Portugal.

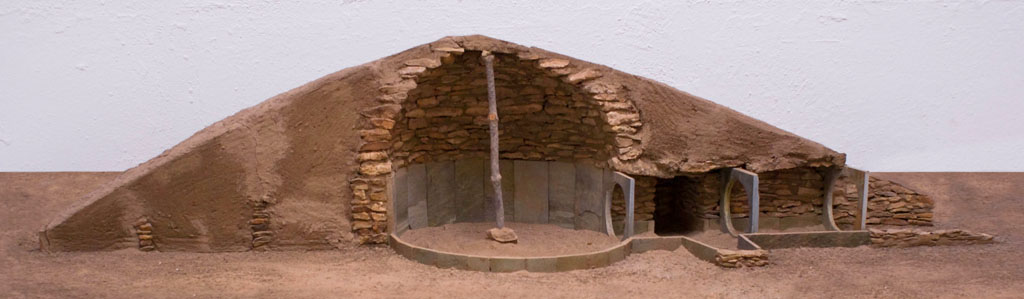
Tholos tomb, Los Millares

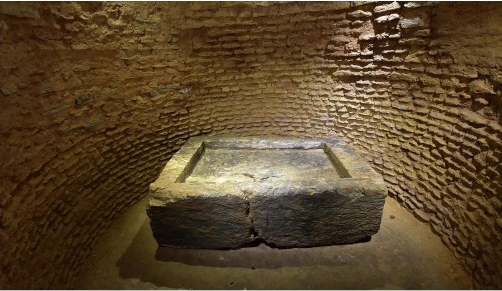
Stone basin in the Matàrrubilla dolmen

== Bronze Age ==
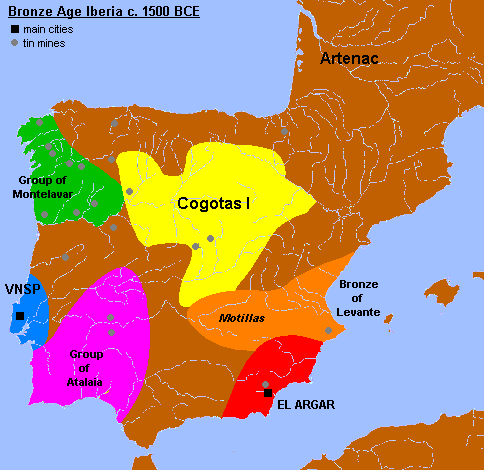
Map: Middle Bronze Age Iberia c. 1500 BC. Shows the main cultures, the two main cities and the location of strategic tin mines

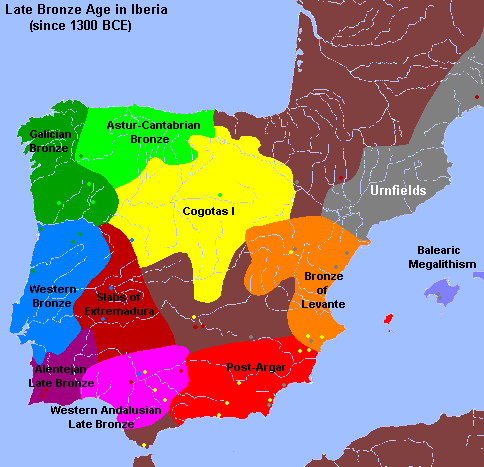
Map of Iberian Late Bronze Age since c. 1300 BC, showing the main cultural areas. Dots show isolated remains of these cultures outside their main area

=== Early Bronze ===
The center of Bronze Age technology is in the southeast since c. 1800 BC. There the civilization of Los Millares was followed by that of El Argar, initially with no other discontinuity than the displacement of the main urban center some kilometers to the north, the gradual appearance of true bronze and arsenical bronze tools and some greater geographical extension. The Argarian people lived in rather large fortified towns or cities.

From this center, bronze technology spread to other areas. Most notable are:

- South-Western Iberian Bronze: in southern Portugal and SW Spain. These poorly defined archaeological horizons show bronze daggers and an expansive trend northward.
- Cogotas I culture (Cogotas II is Iron Age Celtic): the pastoral peoples of the plateau become for the first time culturally unified. Their typical artifact is a rough troncoconic pottery.

Some areas like the civilization of Vila Nova seem to have remained apart from the spread of bronze metallurgy remaining technically in the Chalcolithic period for centuries.

=== Middle Bronze ===
Basically a continuation of the previous period. The most noticeable change happens in the El Argar civilization, which adopts the Aegean custom of burial in pithoi. This phase is known as El Argar B, beginning c. 1500 BC.

The Northwest (Galicia and northern Portugal), a region that held some of the largest reserves of tin (needed to make true bronze) in Western Eurasia, became a focus for mining, incorporating bronze technology. Their typical artifacts are bronze axes (Group of Montelavar).

The semi-desert region of La Mancha shows its first signs of colonization with the fortified scheme of the Motillas (hillforts). This group is clearly related to the Bronze of Levante, showing the same material culture.

=== Late Bronze ===
C. 1300 BC several major changes happen in Iberia, among them:

- The Chalcolithic culture of Vila Nova vanishes, possibly in direct relation to the silting of the canal connecting the main city Zambujal with the sea. It is replaced by a non-urban culture, whose main artifact is an externally burnished pottery.
- El Argar also disappears as such, what had been a very homogeneous culture, a centralized state for some, becomes an array of many post-Argaric fortified cities.
- The Motillas are abandoned.
- Bronze of Levante develops in the Valencian Community.
- The proto-Celtic Urnfield culture appears in the North-East, conquering all Catalonia and some neighbouring areas.
- The Lower Guadalquivir valley shows its first clearly differentiated culture, defined by internally burnished pottery. This group might have some relation with Tartessos.
- Western Iberian Bronze cultures show some degree of interaction, not just among them but also with other Atlantic cultures in Britain, France and elsewhere. This has been called the Atlantic Bronze complex.
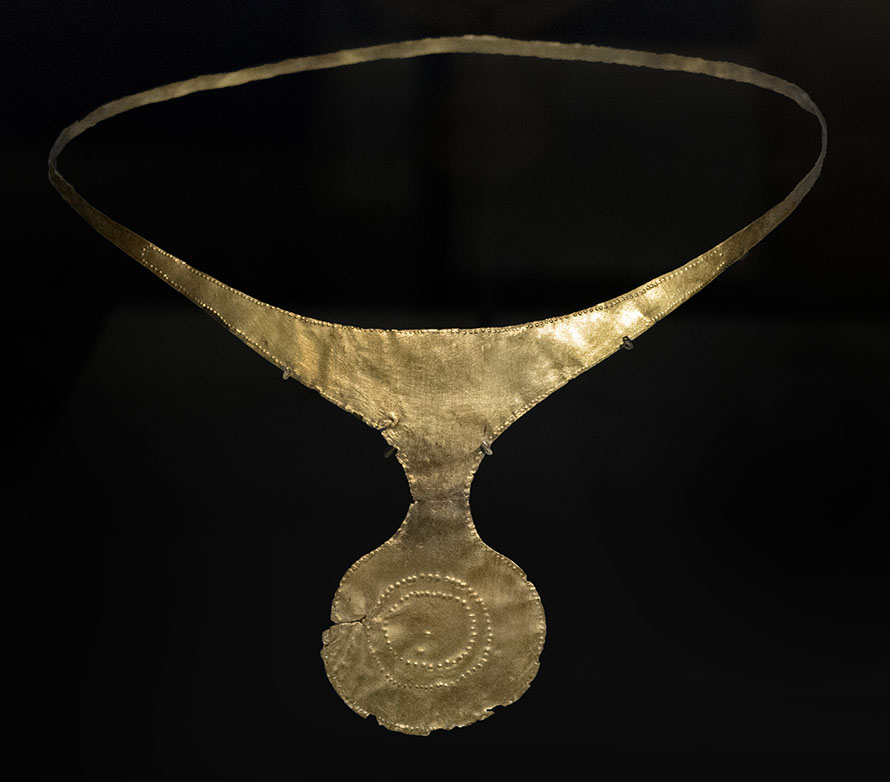
Gold diadem, El Argar, Spain, c. 1600 BC

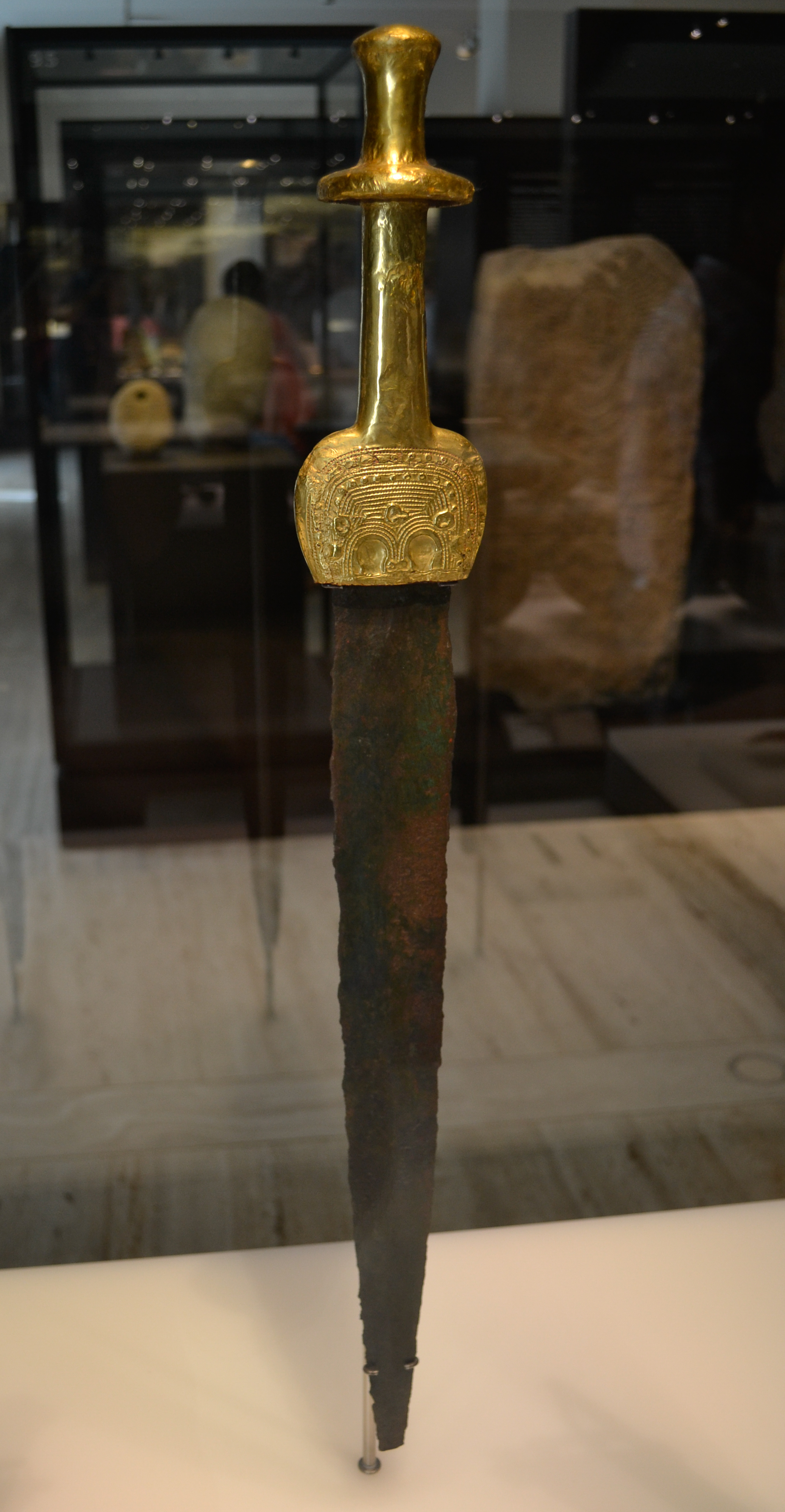
Sword, El Argar, c. 1600 BC

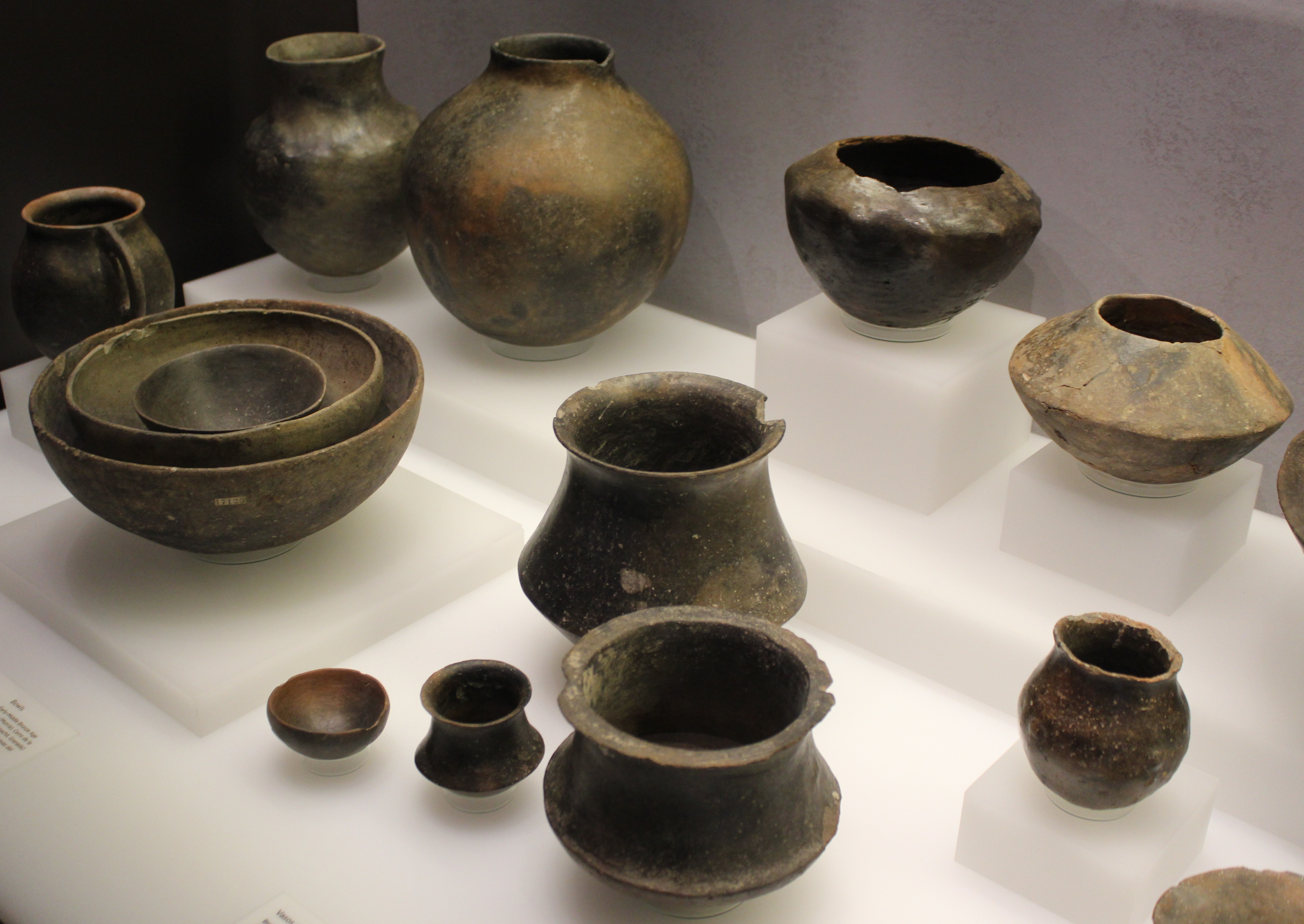
El Argar pottery

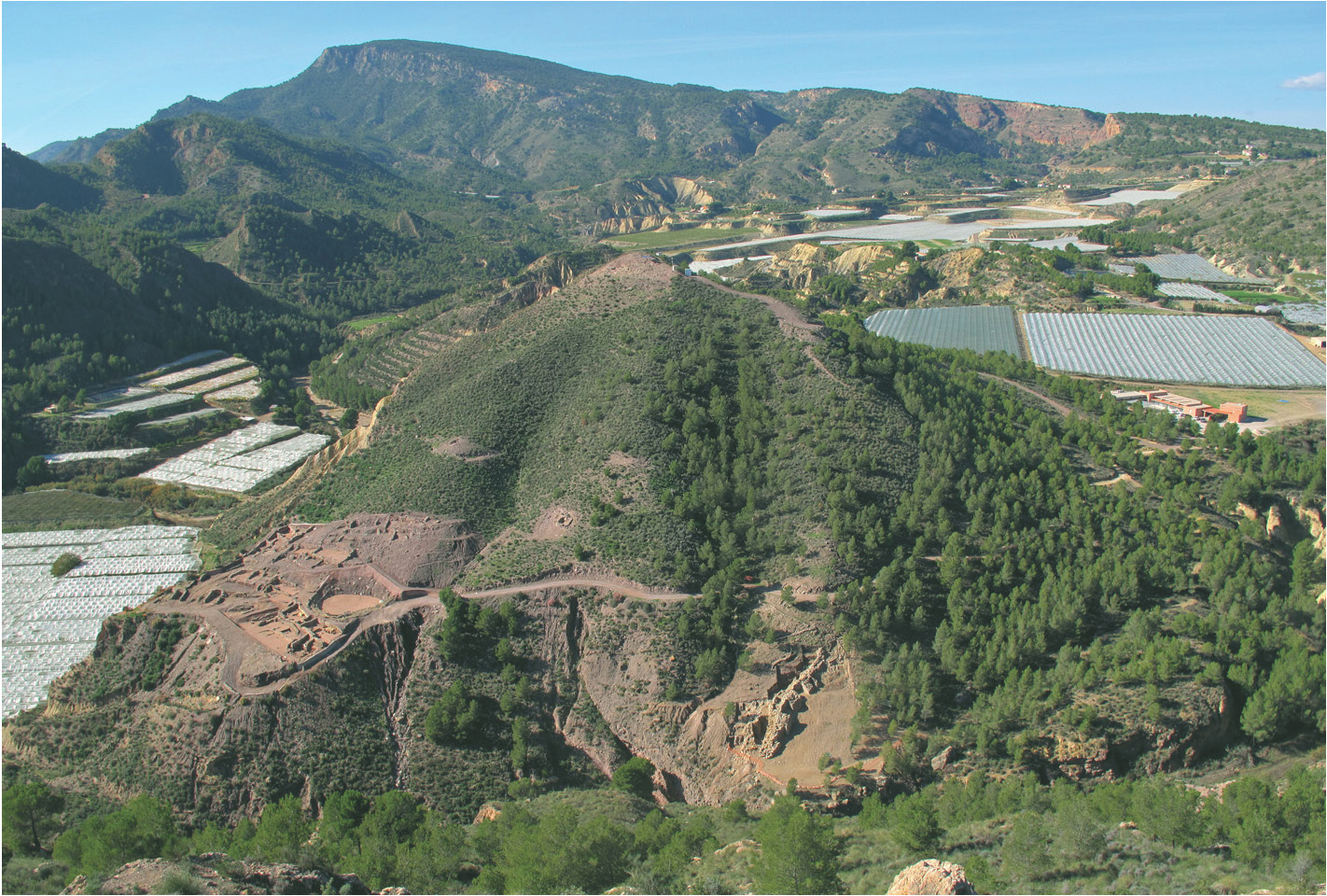
La Bastida de Totana, El Argar, Spain, c. 1600 BC

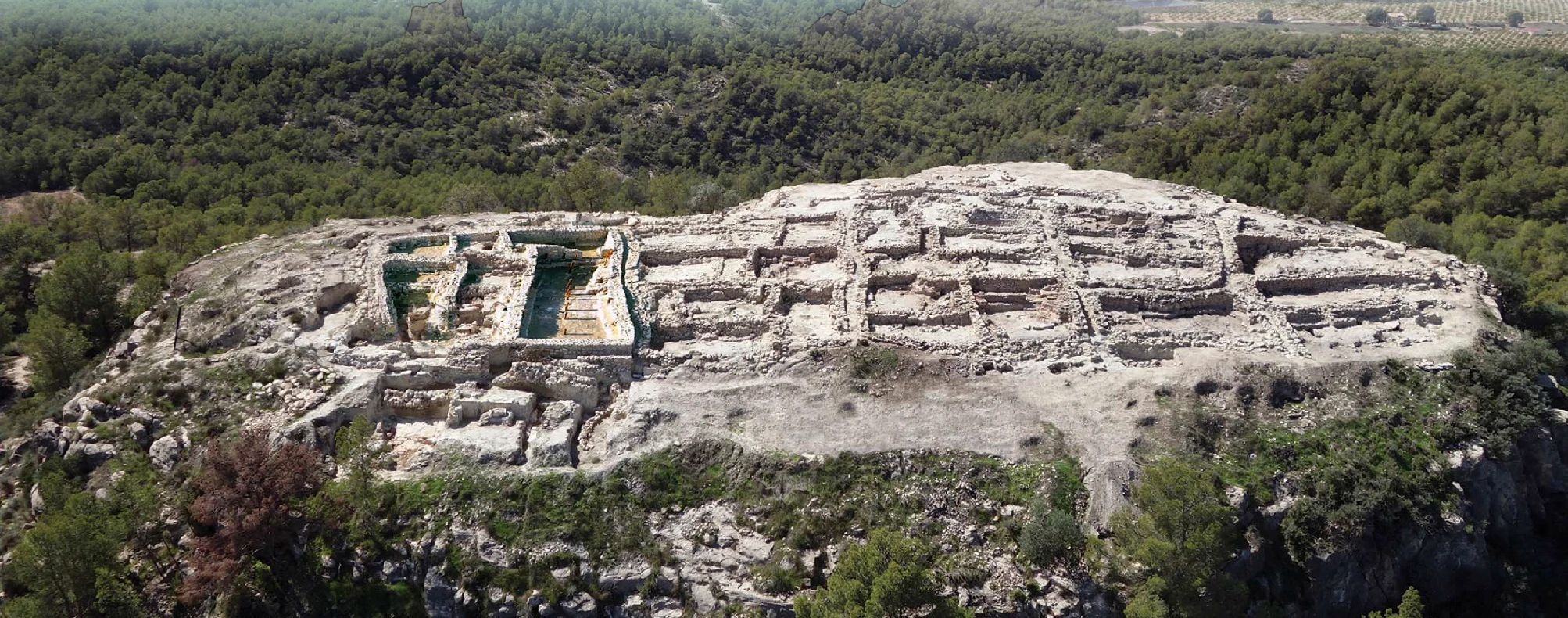
La Almoloya, El Argar, Spain, c. 1700 BC

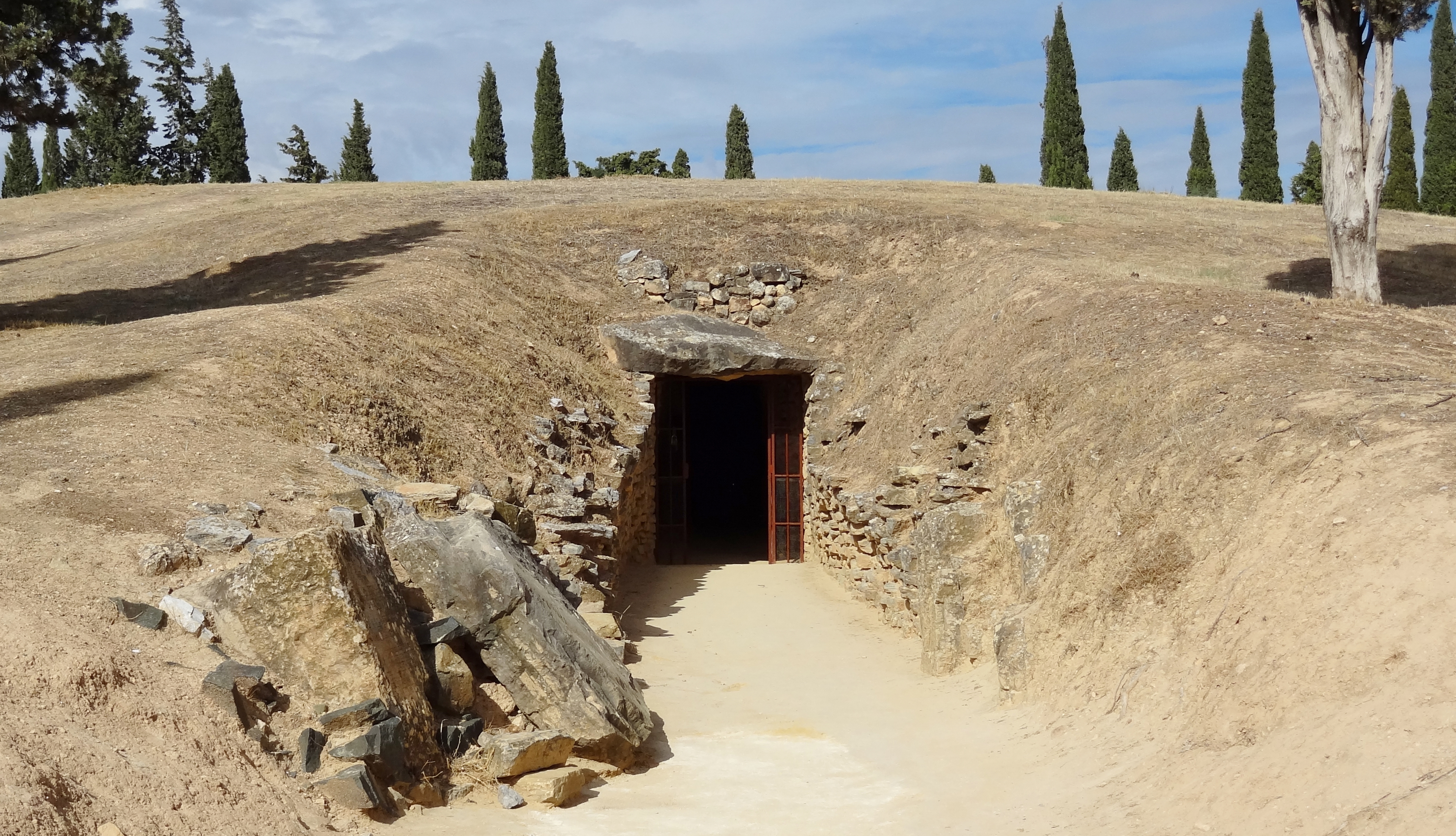
Tholos of El Romeral, Spain, c. 1800 BC

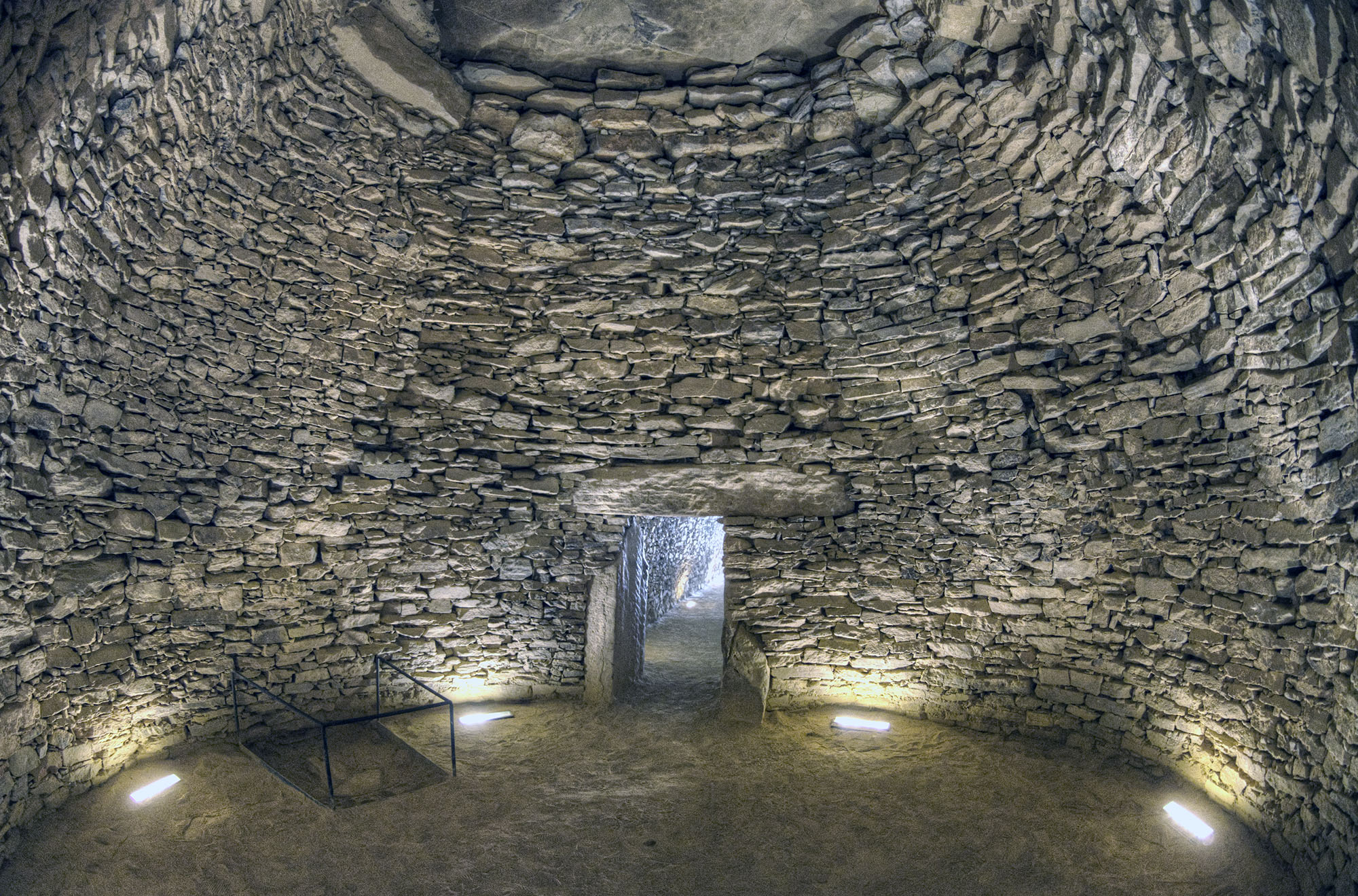
Tholos of El Romeral, interior

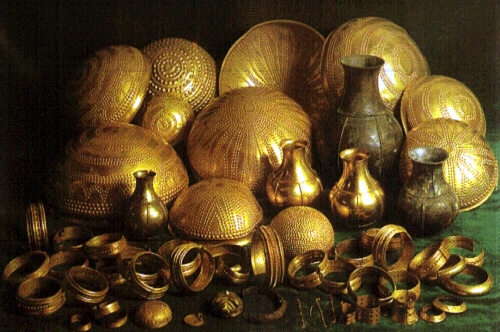
Treasure of Villena, 1300-1000 BC

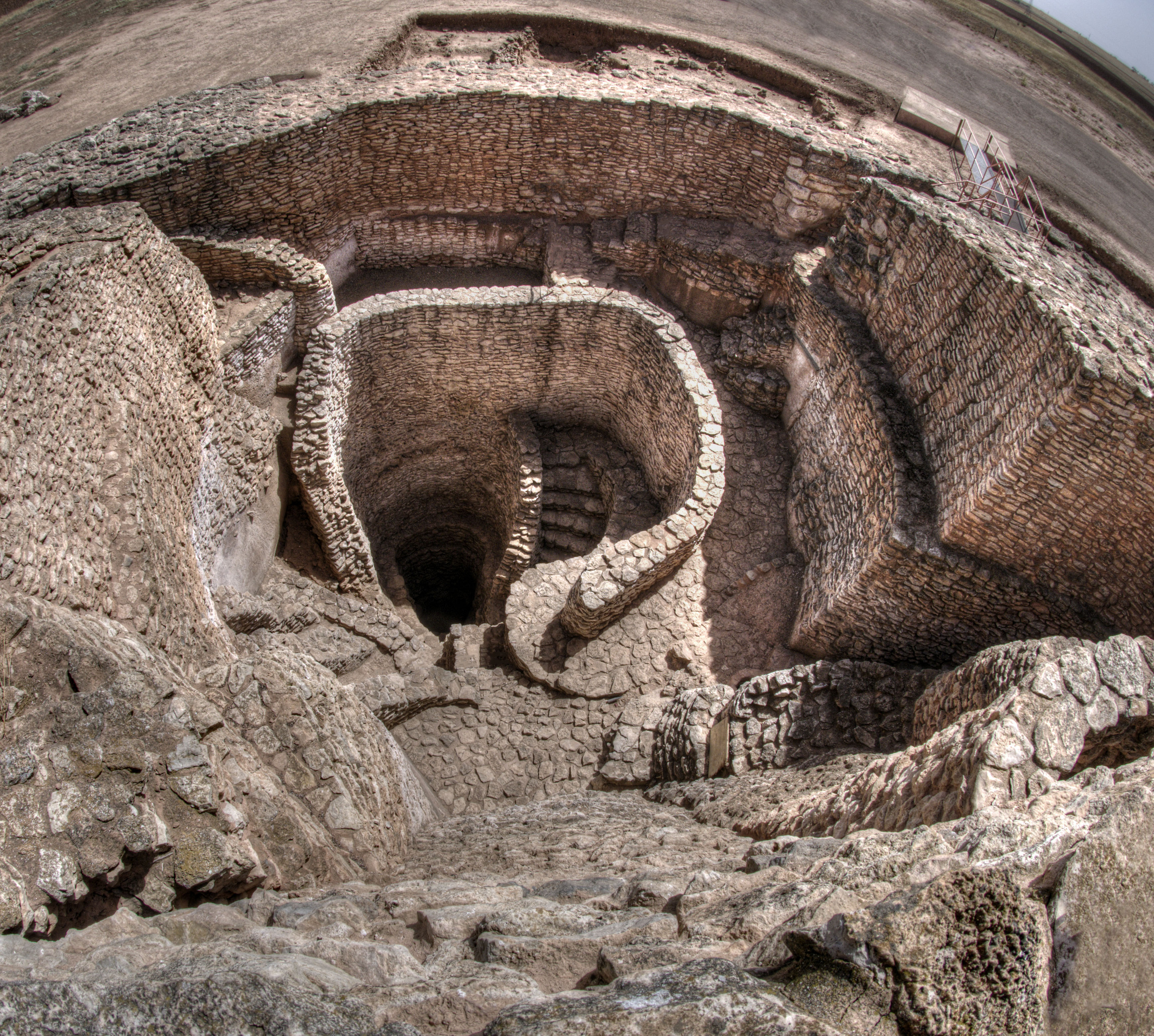
Motilla del Azuer, Spain, c. 2200-1500 BC

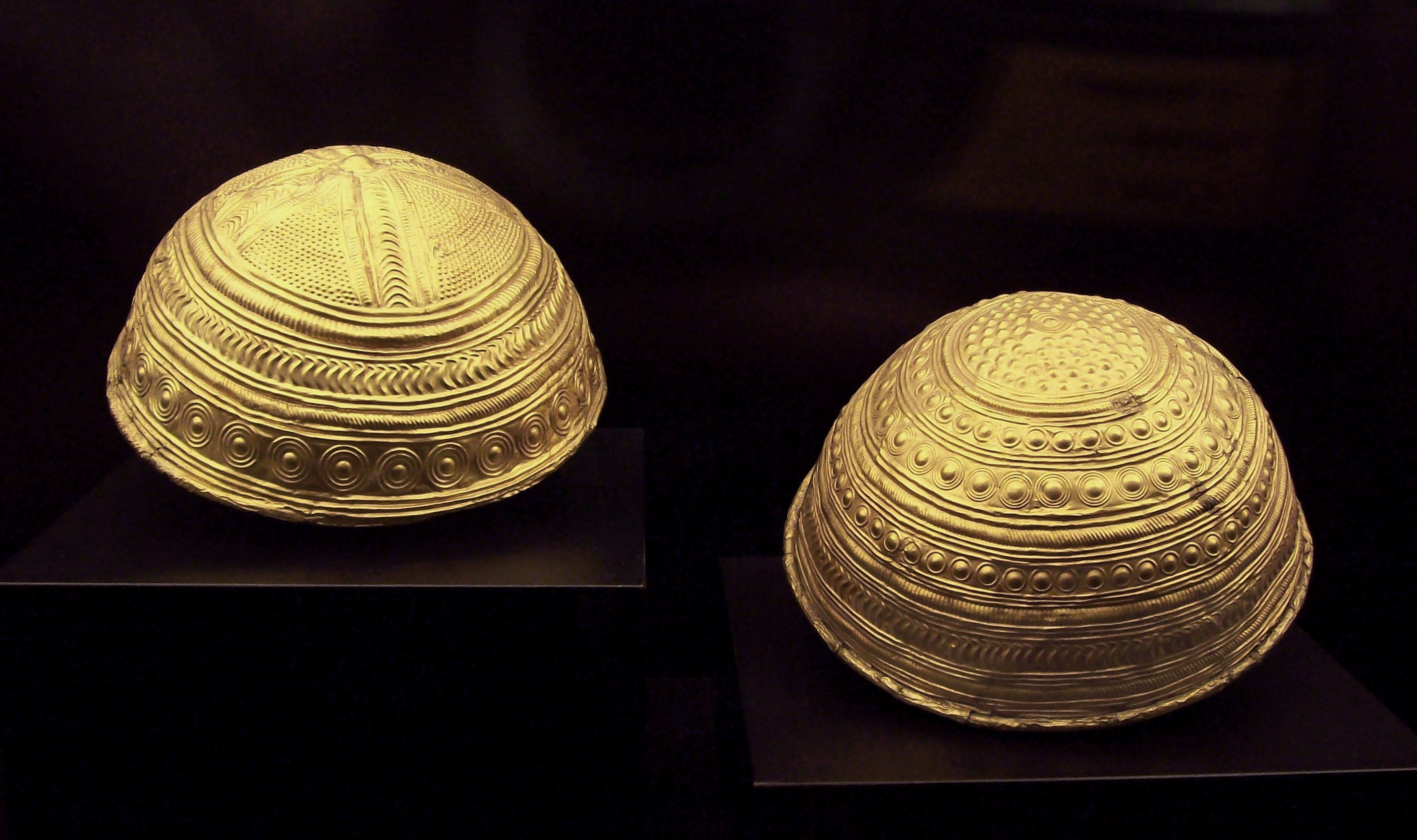
Gold hats or bowls from Axtroki, Basque Country, Spain, c. 1000 BC.

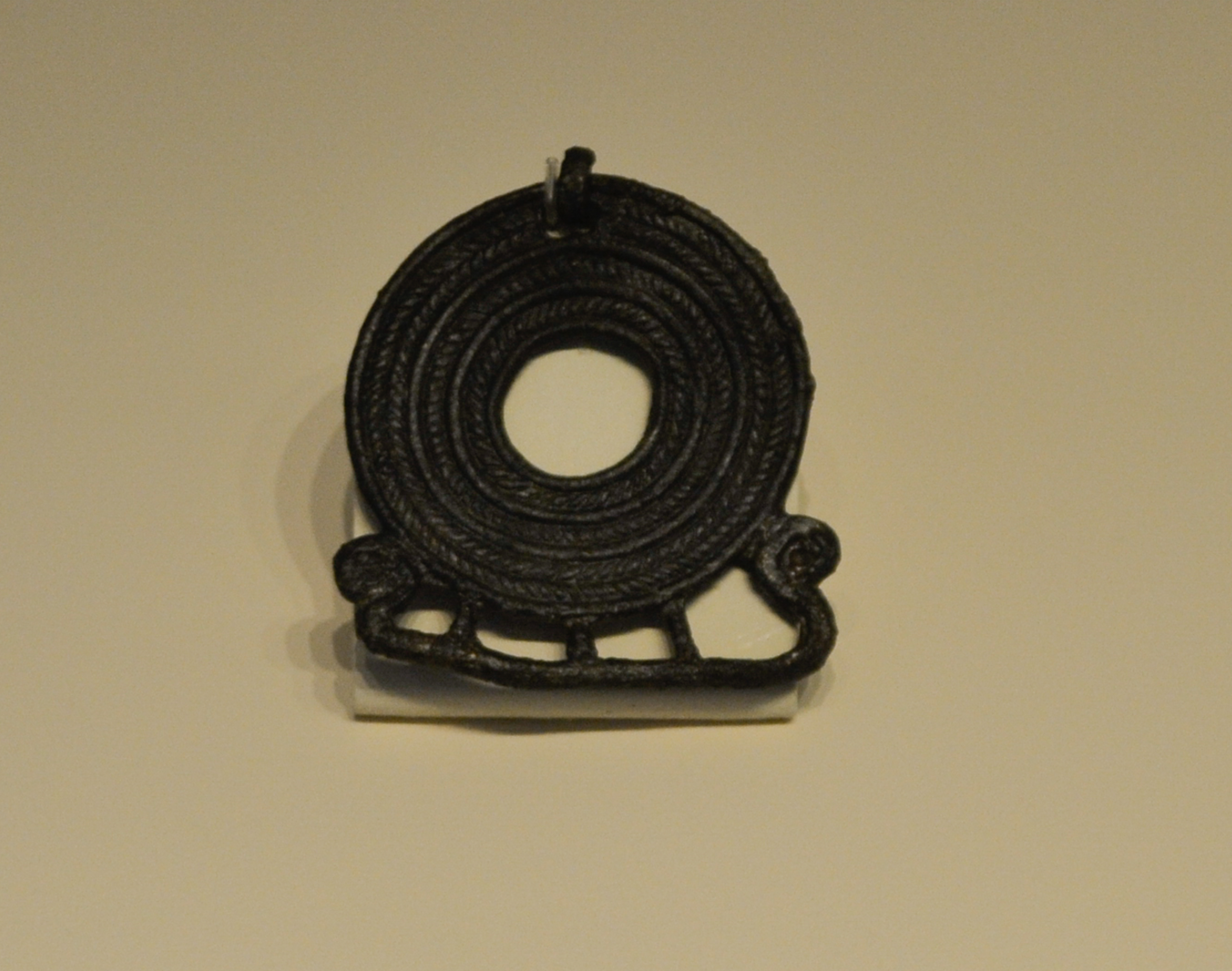
Bronze pendant with sun ship motif, Urnfield culture, Spain

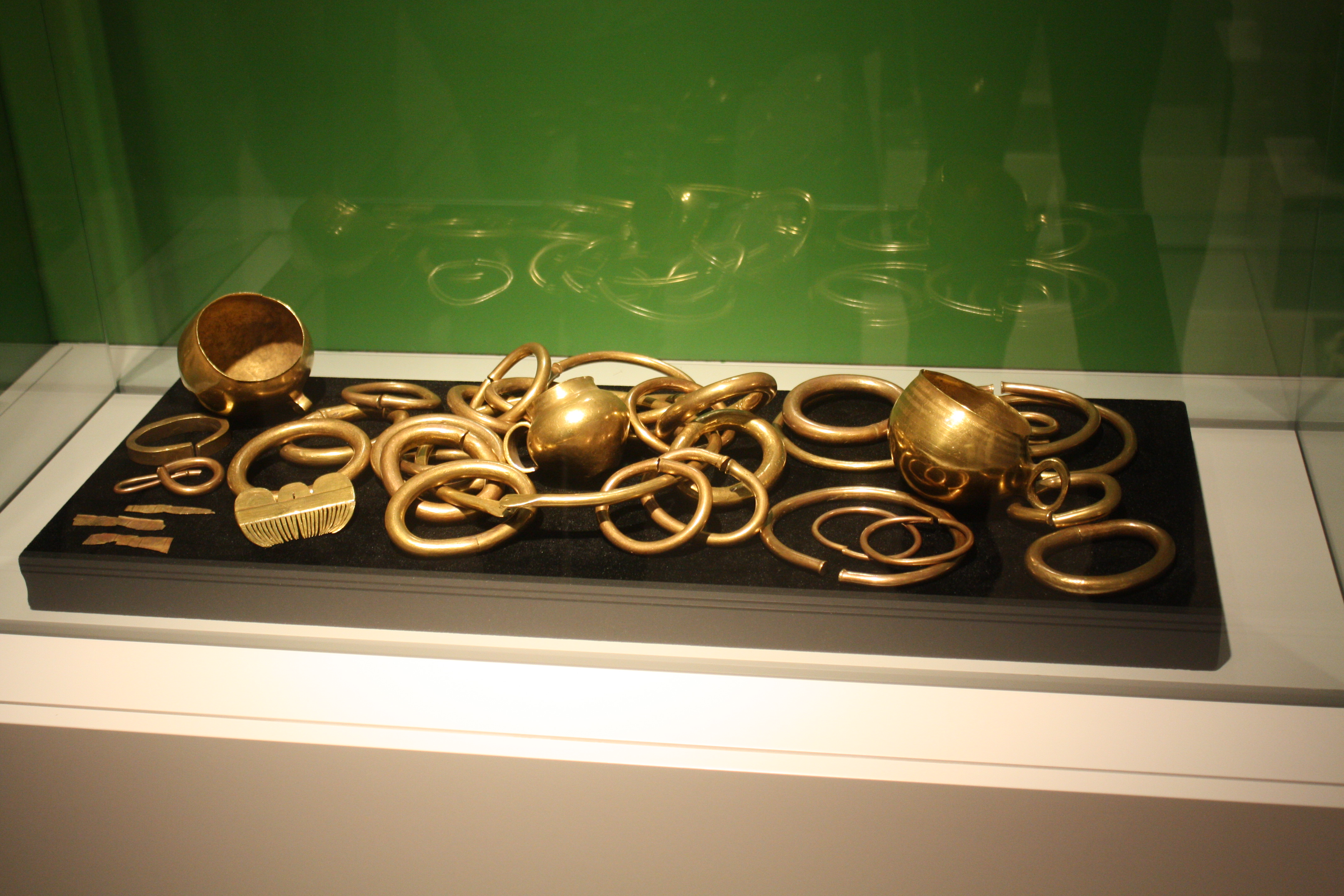
Gold treasure from Caldas, Spain. Atlantic Bronze Age, c. 1500 BC

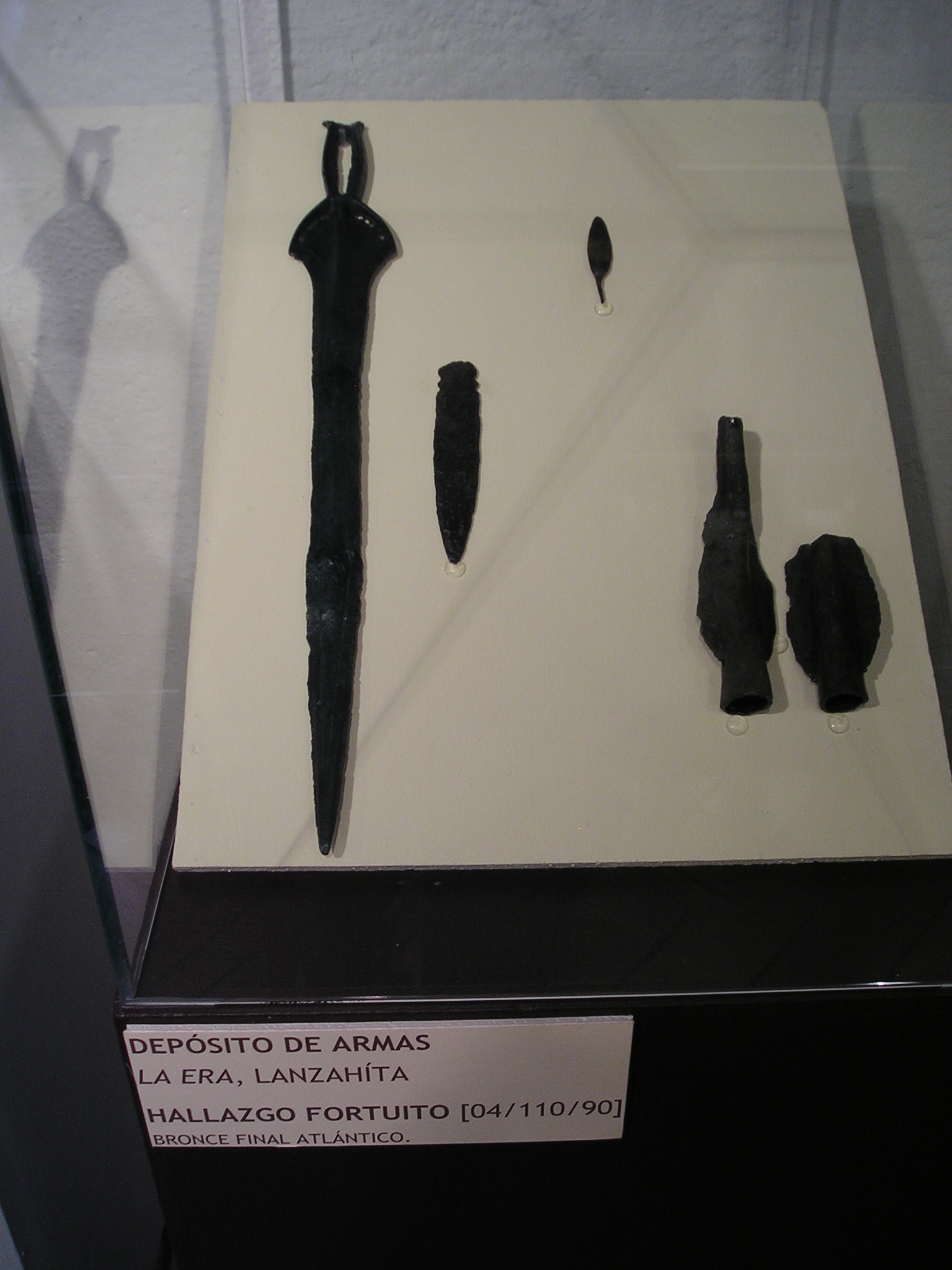
Bronze weapons, Spain. Atlantic Bronze Age.

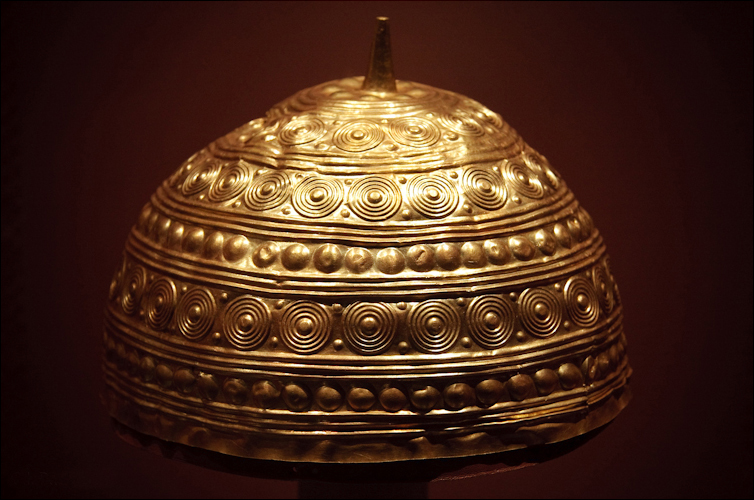
Casco de Leiro, Galicia, Spain. Atlantic Bronze Age, c. 1000 BC

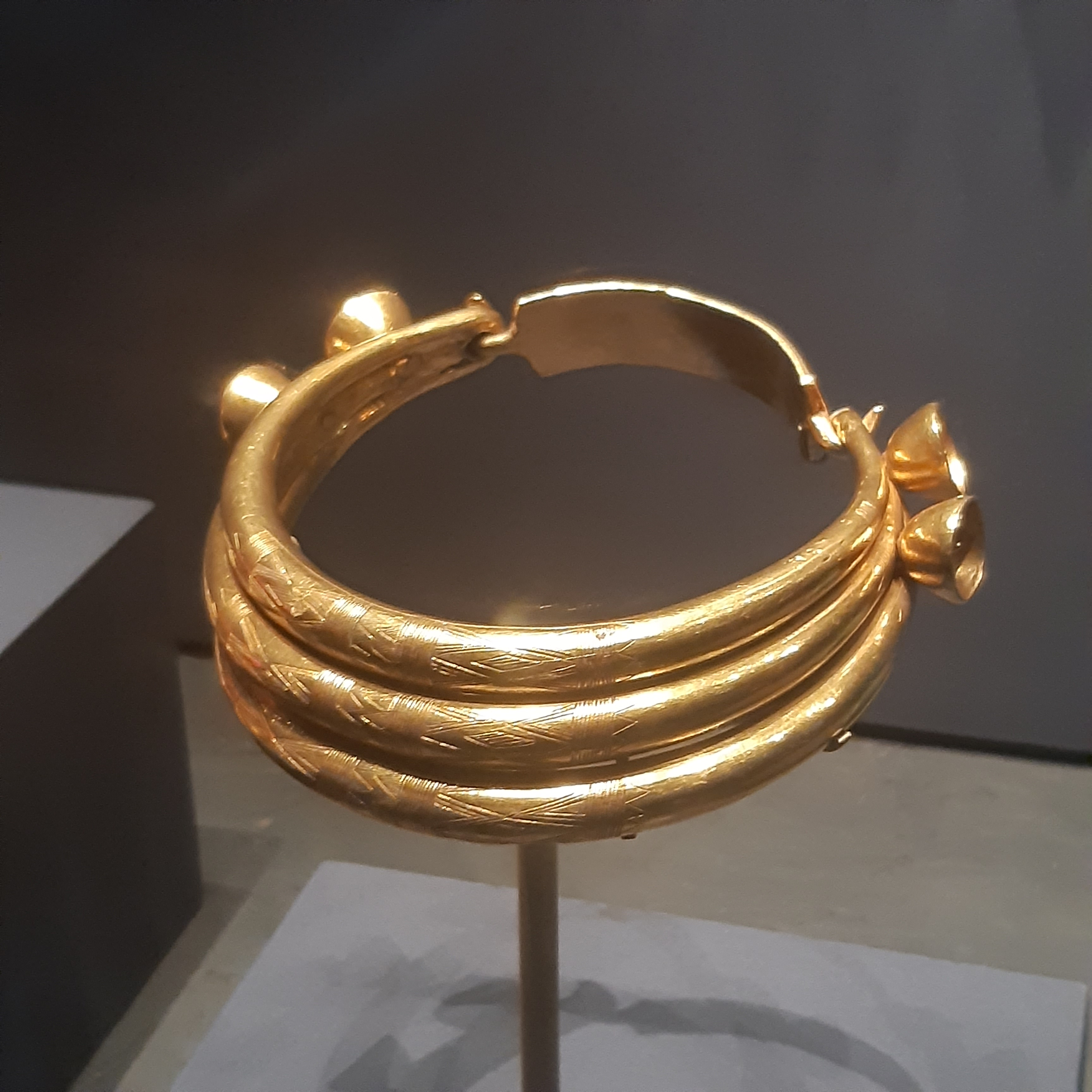
Sintra collar, Portugal, c. 10th century BC

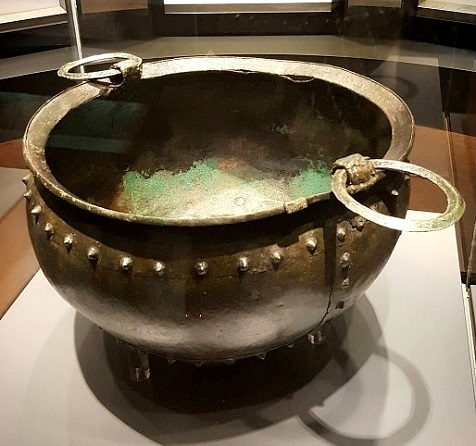
Cauldron from Cantabria, Spain. Atlantic Bronze Age

== Iron Age ==
Iron Age Iberia has two focuses: the Hallstatt-related Urnfields of the North-East and the Phoenician colonies of the South.

During the Iron Age, considered the protohistory of the territory, Celts came, in several waves, possibly starting before 600 BC.

Southwest Paleohispanic script, or Tartessian, seen in Algarve and Lower Alentejo from about the late 8th to the 5th century BC, is possibly the oldest script in Western Europe. It could have come from the Eastern Mediterranean, perhaps from Anatolia or Greece.

=== Early Iron Age cultures ===
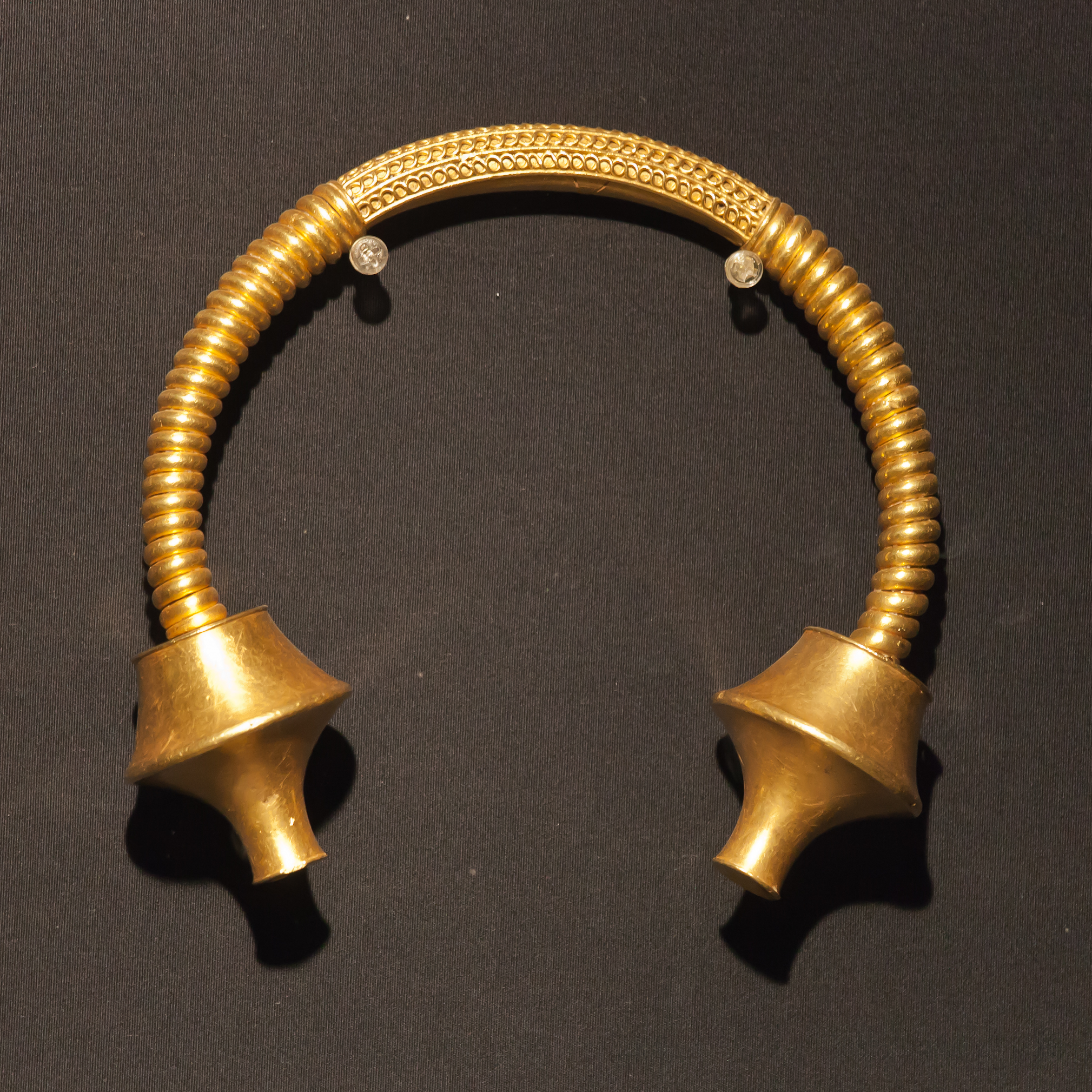
Castro culture gold torc

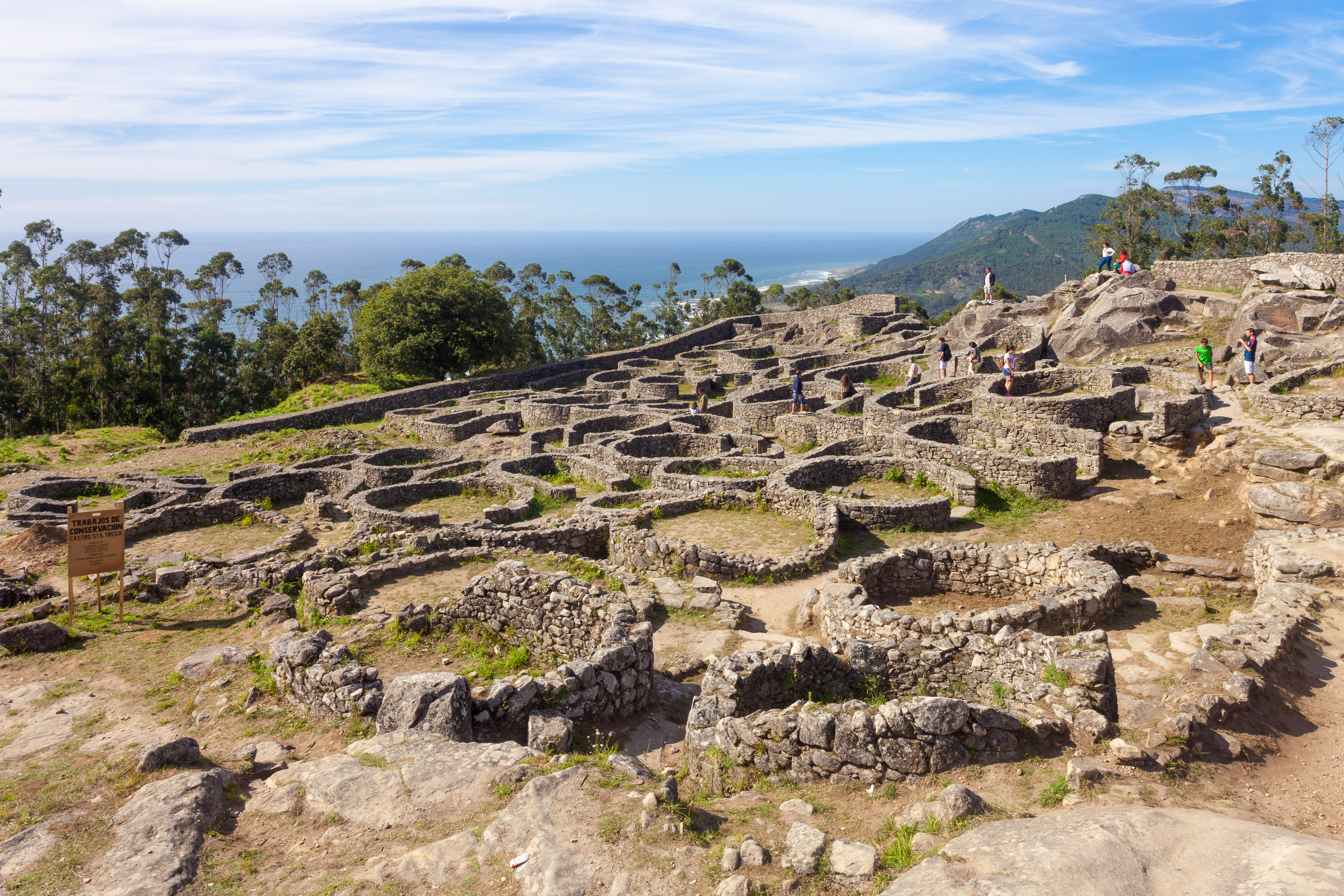
Castro of Santa Trega, Galicia

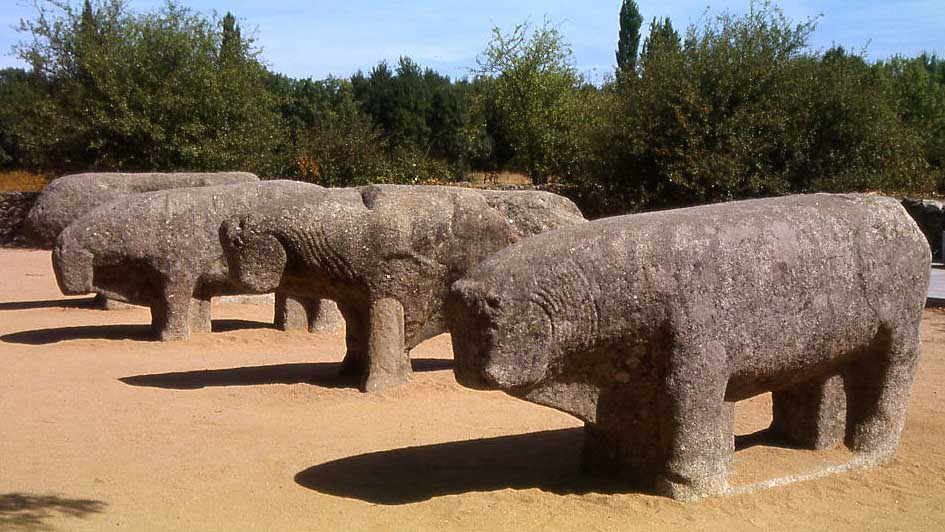
Verracos

.

Tempered steel tools were already in use on the Iberian peninsula in late 8th century BC.

Since the late 8th century BC, the Urnfield culture of North-East Iberia began to develop iron metallurgy, and eventually elements of Hallstatt culture. The earliest elements of this culture were found along the lower Ebro river, then gradually expanded upstream to La Rioja and in a hybrid local form to Alava. There was also expansion southward into Castelló, with less marked influences reaching further south. Some offshoots have been detected along the Iberian Mountains, possibly a prelude to the formation of the Celtiberi.

In this period, the social differentiation became more visible with evidence of local chiefdoms and a horse-riding elite. These transformations may represent the arrival of a new wave of cultures from central Europe.

From these outposts in the Upper Ebro and the Iberian mountains, Celtic culture expanded into the plateau and the Atlantic coast. Several groups can be described:

- The Bernorio-Miraveche group (northern Burgos and Palencia provinces), that would influence the peoples of the northern fringe.
- The northwest Castro culture, in Galicia and northern Portugal, a Celtic culture with peculiarities, due to persistence of aspects of an earlier Atlantic Bronze Age culture.
- The Duero group, possibly the precursor of the Celtic Vaccei.
- The Cogotas II culture, likely precursor of the Celtic or Celtiberian Vettones (or a pre-Celtic culture with substantial Celtic influences), a markedly cattle-herder culture that gradually expanded southward into Extremadura.
- The Lusitanian culture, the precursor of the Lusitani tribe, in central Portugal and Extremadura in western Spain. Generally not considered Celtic since Lusitanian does not meet some the accepted definitions of a Celtic language. Its relationship with the surrounding Celtic culture is unclear. Some believe it was essentially a pre-Celtic Iberian culture with substantial Celtic influences, while others argue that it was an essentially Celtic culture with strong indigenous pre-Celtic influences. There have been arguments for classifying its language as either Italic, a form of archaic Celtic, or proto-Celtic.

All these Indo-European groups have some common elements, like combed pottery since the 6th century and uniform weaponry.

After c. 600 BC, the Urnfields of the North-East were replaced by the Iberian culture, a process that wasn't completed until the 4th century BC. This physical separation from their continental relatives would mean that the Celts of the Iberian peninsula never received the cultural influences of La Tène culture, including Druidism.

=== Phoenician colonies and influence ===
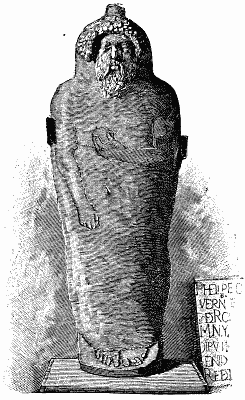
Phoenician sarcophagus found in Cádiz

The Phoenicians of the Levant, Greeks of Europe, and Carthaginians of Africa all colonized parts of Iberia to facilitate trade. In the 10th century BC, the first contacts between Phoenicians and Iberia (along the Mediterranean coast) were made. This century also saw the emergence of towns and cities in the southern littoral areas of eastern Iberia.

The Phoenicians founded the colony of Gadir (now Cádiz) near Tartessos. The foundation of Cádiz, the oldest continuously inhabited city in western Europe, is traditionally dated to 1104 BC, though, as of 2004, no archaeological discoveries date back further than the 9th century BC. The Phoenicians continued to use Cádiz as a trading post for several centuries leaving a variety of artifacts, most notably a pair of sarcophaguses from around the 4th or 3rd century BC. Contrary to myth, there is no record of Phoenician colonies west of Algarve (namely Tavira), though there might have been some voyages of discovery. Phoenician influence in what is now Portugal was essentially through cultural and commercial exchange with Tartessos.

In the 9th century BC, the Phoenicians, from the city-state of Tyre founded the colony of Malaka (now Málaga) and Carthage (in North Africa). During this century, Phoenicians also had great influence on Iberia with the introduction the use of Iron, of the Potter's wheel, the production of olive oil and wine. They were also responsible for the first forms of Iberian writing, had great religious influence and accelerated urban development. However, there is no real evidence to support the myth of a Phoenician foundation of the city of Lisbon as far back as 1300 BC, under the name Alis Ubbo ("Safe Harbour"), even if in this period there are organized settlements in Olissipona (modern Lisbon, in Portuguese Estremadura) with Mediterranean influences.

There was strong Phoenician influence and settlement in the city of Balsa (modern Tavira, Algarve), in the 8th century BC. Phoenician-influenced Tavira was destroyed by violence in the 6th century BC. With the decadence of Phoenician colonization of the Mediterranean coast of Iberia in the 6th century BC many of the colonies are deserted. The 6th century BC also saw the rise of the colonial might of Carthage, which slowly replaced the Phoenicians in their former areas of dominion.

=== Greek colonies ===
The Greek colony at what now is Marseille began trading with the Iberians on the eastern coast around the 8th century BC. The Greeks finally founded their own colony at Ampurias, in the eastern Mediterranean shore (modern Catalonia), during the 6th century BC beginning their settlement in the Iberian peninsula. There are no Greek colonies west of the Strait of Gibraltar, only voyages of discovery. There is no evidence to support the myth of an ancient Greek founding of Olissipo (modern Lisbon) by Odysseus.

=== Tartessian culture ===
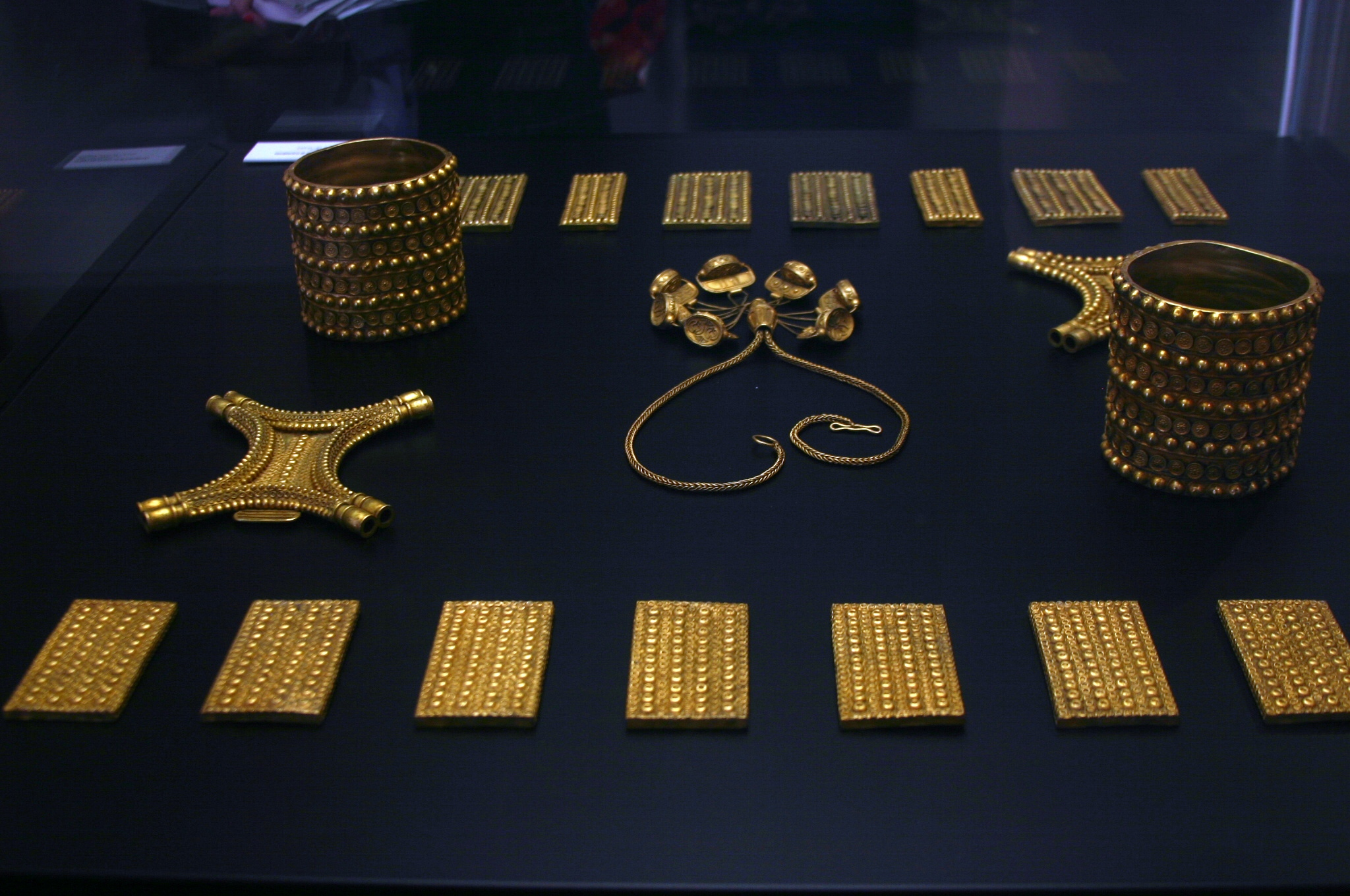
Treasure of El Carambolo, 8th-6th century BC

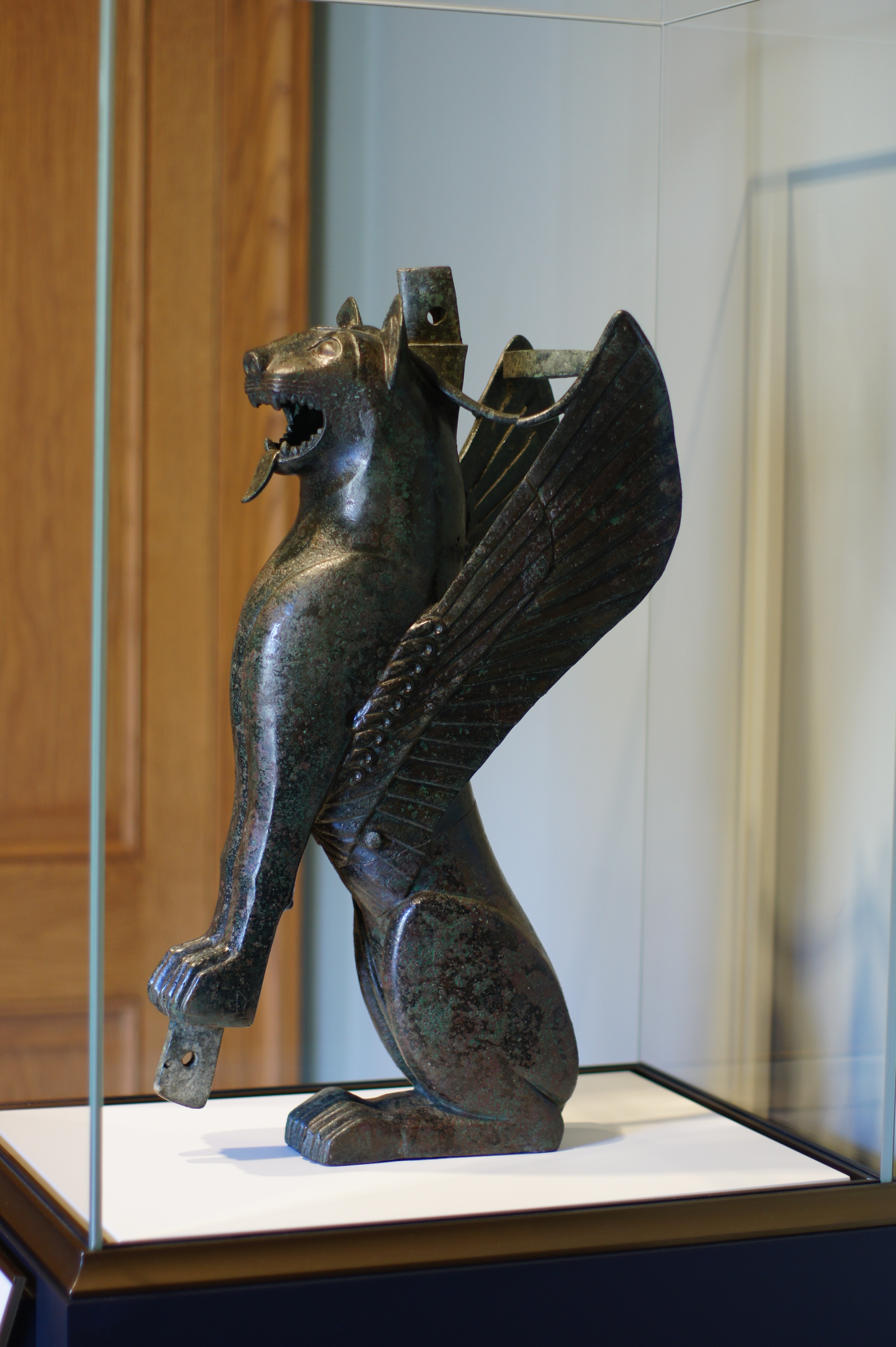
Winged lion, 500 BC

The name Tartessian, when applied in archaeology and linguistics, does not necessarily correlate with the semi-mythical city of Tartessos but only roughly with the area where it is typically assumed it should have been.

The Tartessian culture of southern Iberia is actually the local culture as modified by the increasing influence of eastern Mediterranean elements, especially Phoenician. Its core area is Western Andalusia, but soon extends to Eastern Andalusia, Extremadura and the lands of Murcia and Valencia, where a Tartessian complex, rooted in the local Bronze cultures, is in the last stages of the Bronze Age (9th-8th centuries BC) before Phoenician influence can be seen clearly.

The full Tartessian culture, beginning c.720 BC, also extends to southern Portugal, where is eventually replaced by Lusitanian culture. One of the most significant elements of this culture is the introduction of the potter's wheel, that, along with other related technical developments, causes a major improvement in quality of pottery. There are other major advances in craftsmanship, affecting jewelry, weaving and architecture. This latter aspects is especially important, as the traditional circular huts were then gradually replaced by well finished rectangular buildings. It also allowed for the construction of the tower-like burial monuments that are so typical of this culture.

Agriculture also seems to have experienced major advances with the introduction of steel tools and, presumably, of the yoke and animal traction for the plow. In this period it's noticeable the increase of cattle accompanied by some decrease of sheep and goat types.

Another noticeable element is the major increase in economical specialization and social stratification. This is very noticeable in burials; some show off great wealth (chariots, gold, ivory), while the vast majority are much more modest. There is much diversity in burial rituals in this period but the elites seem to converge in one single style: a chambered mound. Some of the most affluent burials are generally attributed to local monarchs.

One of the developments of this period is writing, a skill which was probably acquired through contact with the Phoenicians. John T. Koch controversially claimed to have deciphered the extant Tartessian inscriptions and to have tentatively identified the language as an earlier form of the Celtic languages now spoken in the British Isles and Brittany in the book 'Celtic from the West', published in 2010. However, the linguistic mainstream continues to treat Tartessian as an unclassified, possibly pre-Indo-European language, and Koch's decipherment of the Tartessian script and his theory for the evolution of Celtic has been strongly criticized.

=== Iberian culture ===
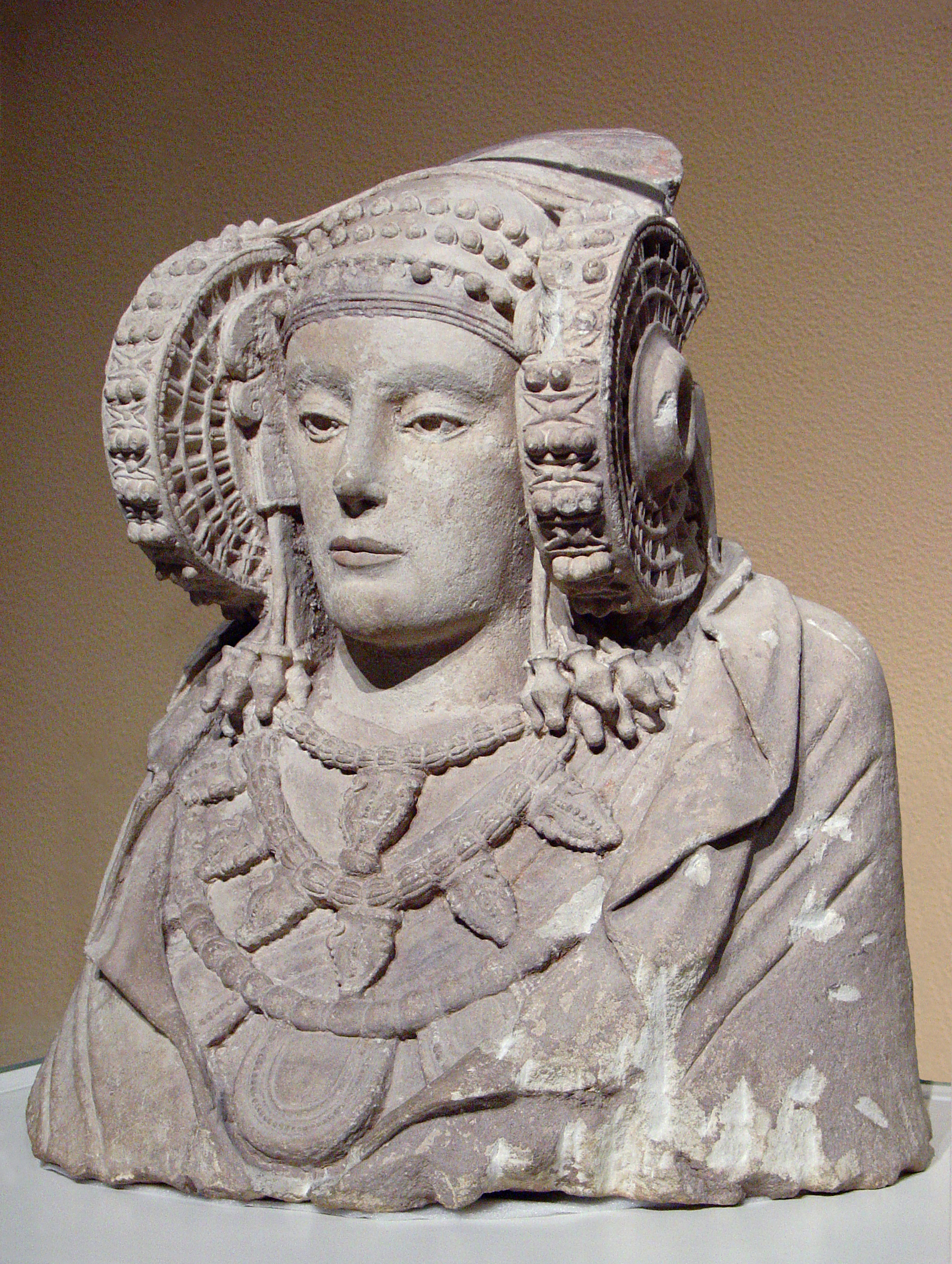
The Lady of Elche, 4th century BC

In the Iberian culture people were organized in chiefdoms and states. Three phases can be identified: the Ancient, the Middle and the Late Iberian period.

With the arrival of Greek influence, not limited to their few colonies, the Tartessian culture begins to transform itself, especially in the South East. This late period is known as the Iberian culture, that in Western Andalusia and the non-Celtic areas of Extremadura is called Ibero-Turdetanian because of its stronger links with the Tartessian substrate.

Greek influence is visible in the gradual change of the style of their monuments that approach more and more the models arrived from the Greek world. Thus the obelisk-like funerary monuments of the previous period now adopt a column like form, totally in line with Greek architecture.

By mid 5th century, aristocratic power was increased and resulted in the abandonment and transformation of the orientalizing model. The oppidum appeared and became the socio-economic model of the aristocratic class. The commerce was also one of the principal sources of aristocratic control and power. In the southeast, between the end of the 5th and the end of the 4th century BC, appeared a highly hierarchical aristocratic society. There were different forms of political control. The power and control seemed to be in the hand of kings or reguli.

Iberian funerary customs are dominated by cremation necropolis, that are partly due to the persistent influences of the Urnfield culture, but they also include burial customs imported from the Greek cultural area (mudbrick rectangular mound).

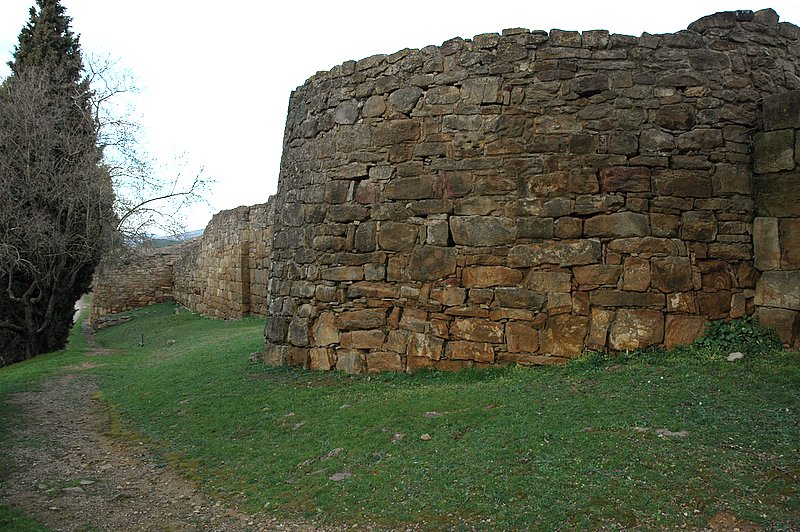
Remains of the walls of Ullastret, Catalonia, c. 250 BC

Urbanism was important in the Iberian cultural area, especially in the south, where Roman accounts mention hundreds of oppida (fortified towns). In these towns (some quite large, some mere fortified villages) the houses were typically arranged in contiguous blocks, in what seems to be another Urnfield cultural influx.

The Iberian script evolved from the Tartessian one with Greek influences that are noticeable in the transformation of some characters. In a few cases a variant of Greek alphabet (Ibero-Ionian script) was used to write Iberian as well.

The transformation from Tartessian to Iberian culture was not sudden but gradual and was more marked in the East, where it begins in the 6th century BC, than in the south-west, where it is only noticeable since the 5th century BC and much more tenuous. A special case is the northeast where the Urnfield culture was Iberized but keeping some elements from the Indo-European substrate.

=== Post-Tartessos Iron Age ===
Main language areas of pre-Roman Iberia, according to epigraphy and toponymy.

Also in the 6th century BC there was a cultural shift in southwest Iberia (southern Portugal and nearby parts of Andalusia) after Tartessos fell; with a strong Mediterranean character that prolonged and modified Tartessian culture. This occurred mainly in Low Alentejo and Algarve, but had littoral extensions up to the Sado mouth (namely the important city of Bevipo, modern Alcácer do Sal). The first form of writing in western Iberia (south of Portugal), the Southwest Paleohispanic script (still to be translated), dated to the 6th century BC, denotes strong Tartessian influence in its use of a modified Phoenician alphabet. In these writings the word "Conii" (similar to Cunetes or Cynetes, the people of Algarve) appears frequently.

In the 4th century BC, the Celtici appear, a late expansion of Celtic culture into the southwest (southern Extremadura, Alentejo and northern Algarve). The Turduli and Turdetani, probably descendants of the Tartessians, though Celticized, became established in the area of the Guadiana river, in southern Portugal. A series of cities in Algarve, such as Balsa (Tavira), Baesuris (Castro Marim), Ossonoba (Faro) and Cilpes (Silves), became inhabited by the Cynetes.

=== Arrival of Romans and Punic Wars ===
In the 4th century BC, Rome began to rise as a Mediterranean power rival to the North African based Carthage. After suffering defeat to the Romans in the First Punic War (264–241 BC), the Carthaginians began to extend their power into the interior of Iberia from their south eastern coastal settlements but this empire was to be short lived. In 218 BC the Second Punic War started and the Carthaginian general Hannibal marched his armies, which included Iberians, from Iberia, across the Pyrenees and the Alps and attacked the Romans in Italy. Starting in the north-east, Rome began its conquest of the Iberian Peninsula.

== See also ==
- Pre-Roman peoples of the Iberian Peninsula
- Timeline of Portuguese history
- Timeline of Spanish history
- Prehistory of the Valencian Community
