= Antequera Dolmens Site =

UNESCO World Heritage Site
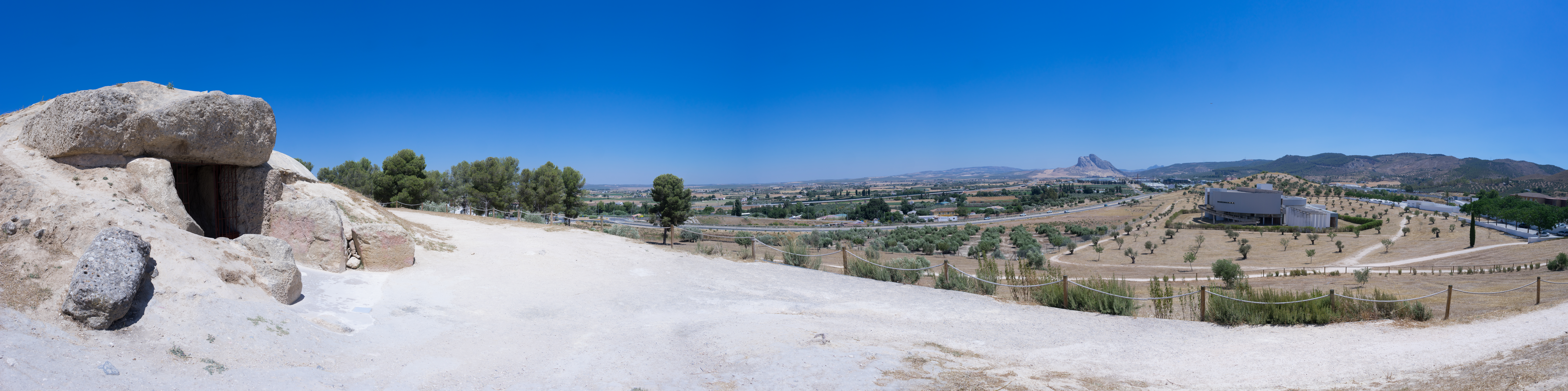
- Panorama of the Dolmen of Menga site

- Location within Spain Location within Andalusia
- Location: Antequera, Province of Málaga, Andalusia, Spain
- Includes: The Menga Dolmen and the Viera Dolmen; Tholos of El Romeral; La Peña de los Enamorados; El Torcal de Antequera
- Criteria: Cultural: (i), (iii), (iv)
- Reference: 1501
- Inscription: 2016 (40th Session)
- Area: 2,446.3 ha (9.445 sq mi)
- Buffer zone: 10,787.7 ha (41.652 sq mi)
- Website: www.museosdeandalucia.es/cultura/museos/CADA/
- Coordinates: 37°1′30″N 4°32′40″W

The Antequera Dolmens Site is a cultural heritage ensemble comprising three cultural monuments (the Dolmen of Menga, Dolmen of Viera and Tholos of El Romeral) and 2 natural mountain features (the Peña de los Enamorados and El Torcal) in and near the city of Antequera in Andalusia, Spain. The cultural institution responsible for its protection is the CADA (Conjunto Arqueológico Dólmenes de Antequera, Archeological Ensemble Dolmens of Antequera). It was declared a World Heritage Site in 2016.

== Outstanding Universal Value ==
For something to be declared World Heritage Site, it must demonstrate exceptional universal value; that is, an extraordinary importance transcending national borders and of interest to present and future generations of all humanity.

UNESCO requires justification of at least one of the six criteria set for the cultural heritage by the Convention on the Protection of the World Cultural and Natural Heritage (1972) to demonstrate the exceptional universal value of the site. The proposal of the Antequera Dolmens Site is based on one of them (i); the International Council on Monuments and Sites in its final report incorporates other two (iii, iv).

- Criterion (i): "represent a masterpiece of the human creative genius"

The Neolithic Dolmen of Menga represents one of the most important masterpiece of megalithic architecture (Atlantic tradition) based on post-and-lintel construction with an earthen covering, notable for its enormous dimensions that push the size possible in a corridor sepulcher by incorporating the unprecedented solution of intermediate pillars; likewise, the later, Chalcolithic tholos (beehive tomb) of El Romeral complements the two dolmens with its corridor and false dome of drystone masonry (Mediterranean tradition).

- Criterion (iii): "provide a unique testimony, or at least exceptional, on a cultural tradition or a living or dead civilization"

Both the Dolmen of Menga and the Tholos of El Romeral have anomalous orientations. The archaeoastronomer Michael Hoskin, who studied the site, noted that, whereas the axes of almost all dolmens around the Mediterranean are oriented to a celestial feature, such as sunrise at dawn on the equinoxes (as occurs in the Dolmen of Viera), the Dolmen of Menga points to the striking nearby peak called the Peña de los Enamorados. This rises abruptly from the plain and contains the contemporaneous rock shelter of Matacabras, in which cave paintings are found. Meanwhile, the Tholos of El Romeral is oriented to the mountains of El Torcal, containing the Cave of the Bull (terrestrial orientation), as well as to the noon sun on the winter solstice (celestial orientation). El Torcal is noted for the extensive, otherworldly karst landscape at its summit. In addition, the Tholos of El Romeral lies along an axis from the Dolmen of Menga to the Peña de los Enamorados. Thus, the Dolmens of Antequera construct a unique megalithic landscape by their relationship with the surrounding natural elements.

- Criterion (iv): "be an outstanding example of a type of building or architectural or technological ensemble or landscape which illustrates one or several significant periods of human history"

The three megalithic monuments reflect a stage of human history in which the first ceremonial monuments in Western Europe were built, according to the two major building traditions of megalithic art (lintel and beehive). This is an unusual proposal on the List of World Heritage Sites as it is not being put forward as a mixed heritage site, in which its cultural value would be added to its natural value, but as an integration and close dialogue between the megalithic architecture and the landscape. A phenomenon of "landscape monumentalization" has occurred here by which the natural landmarks acquire the value of monuments while the manmade constructs present the appearance of a natural landscape.

Finally, the authenticity of the megaliths is well established, with the Dolmen of Menga dating to the Neolithic and the Tholos of El Romeral to the Chalcolithic, and the structures retain high integrity, being in good condition and well maintained.

== Gallery ==
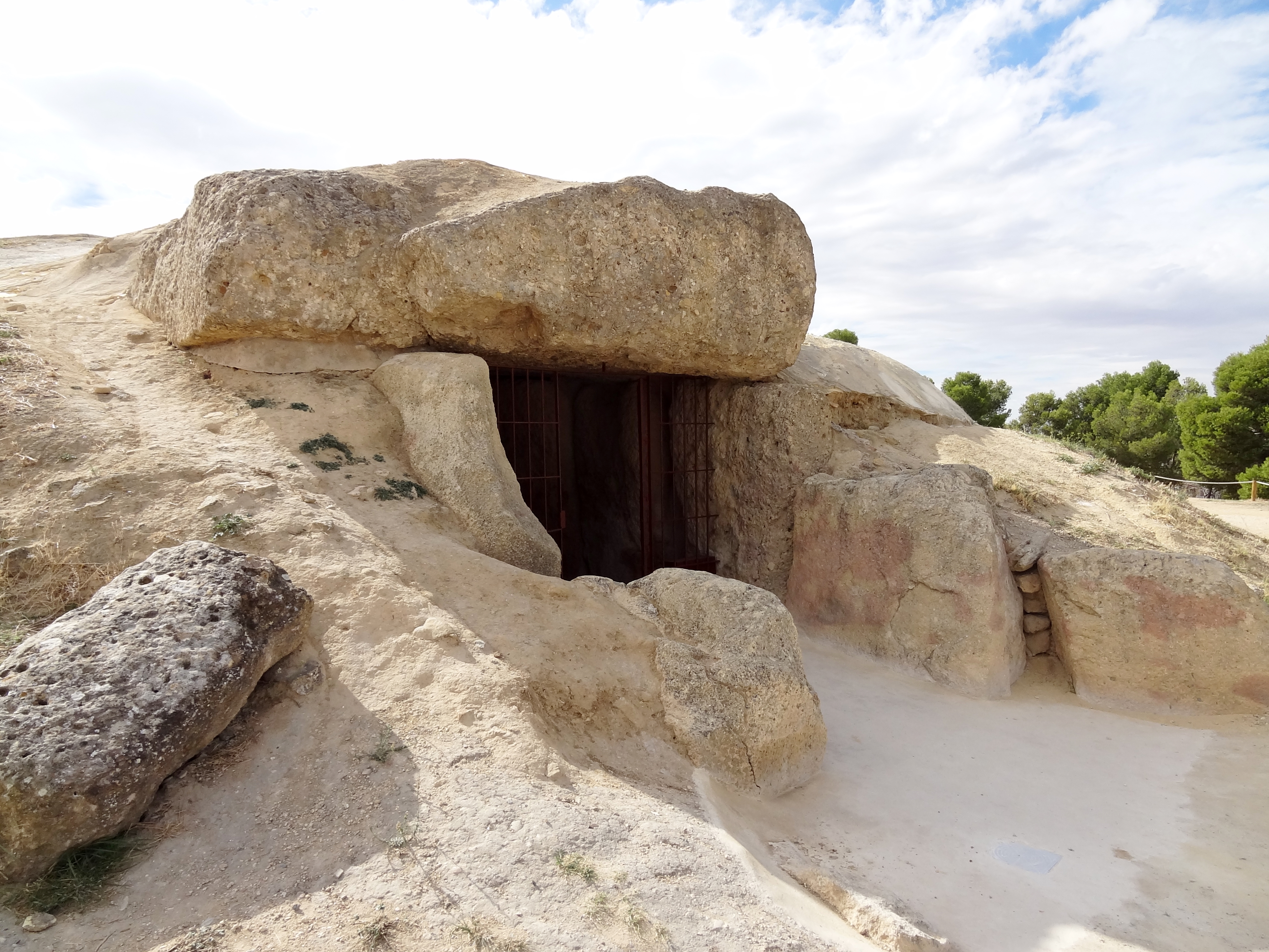
Dolmen of Menga

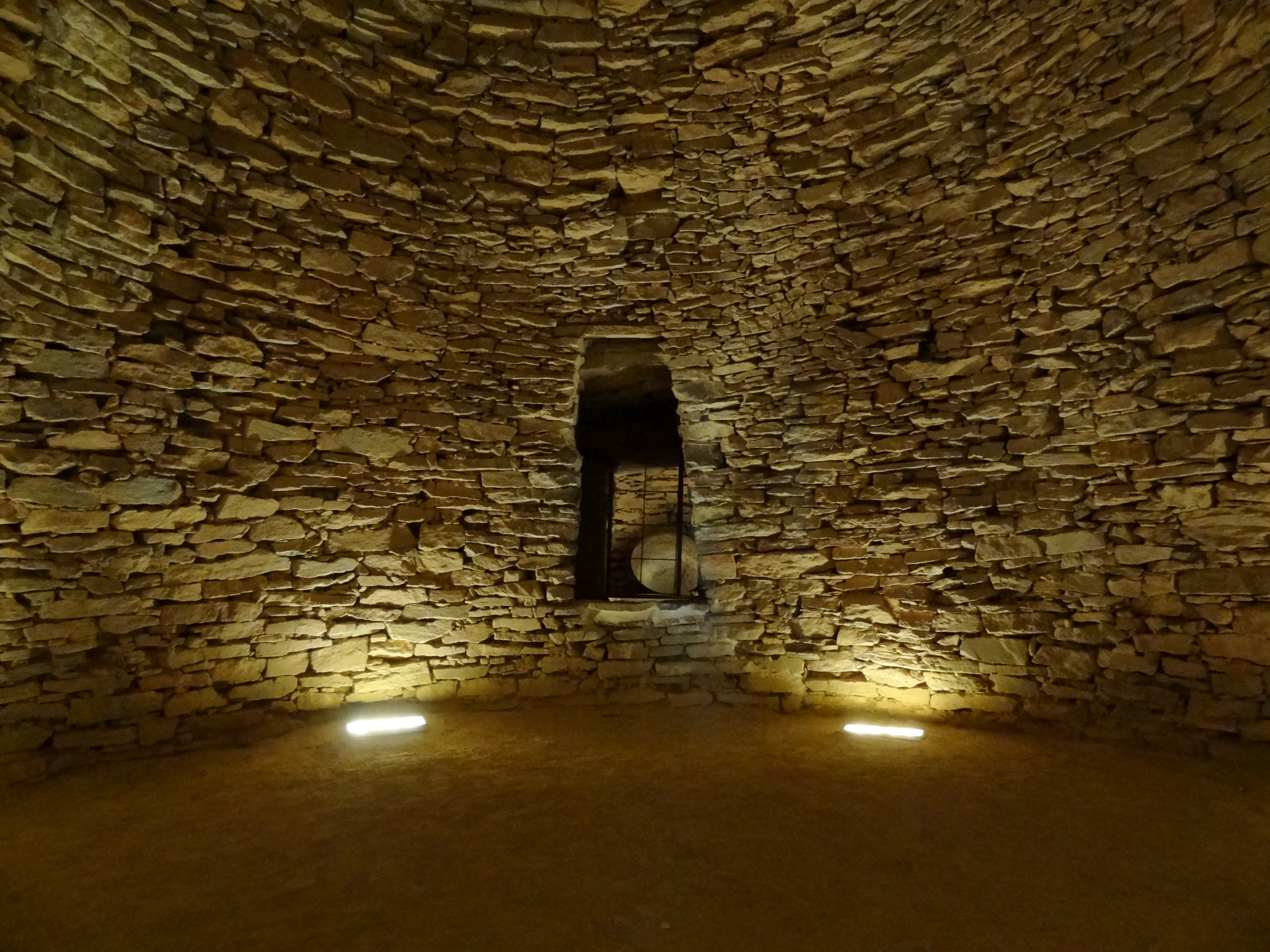
Tholos of El Romeral

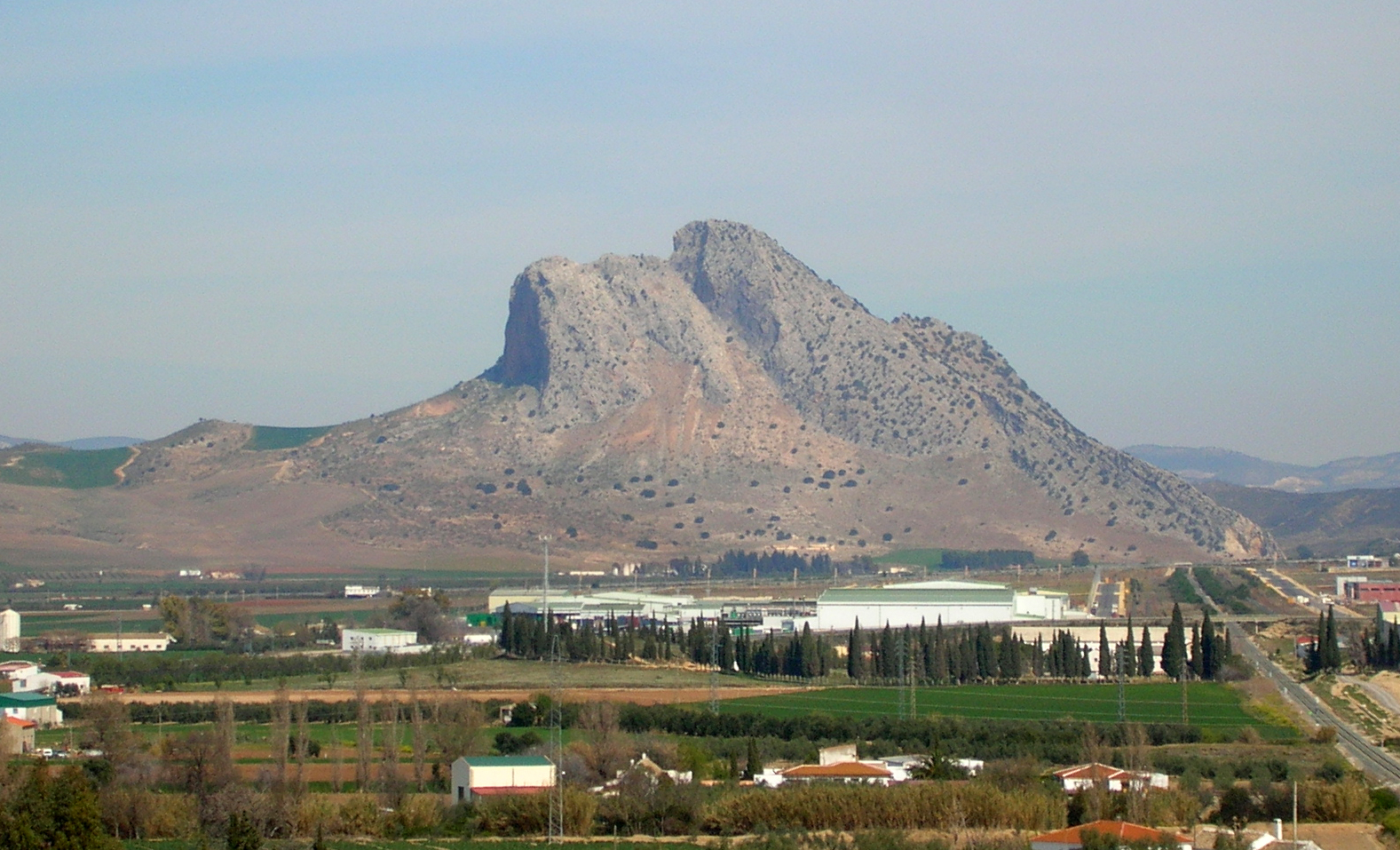
Peña de los Enamorados

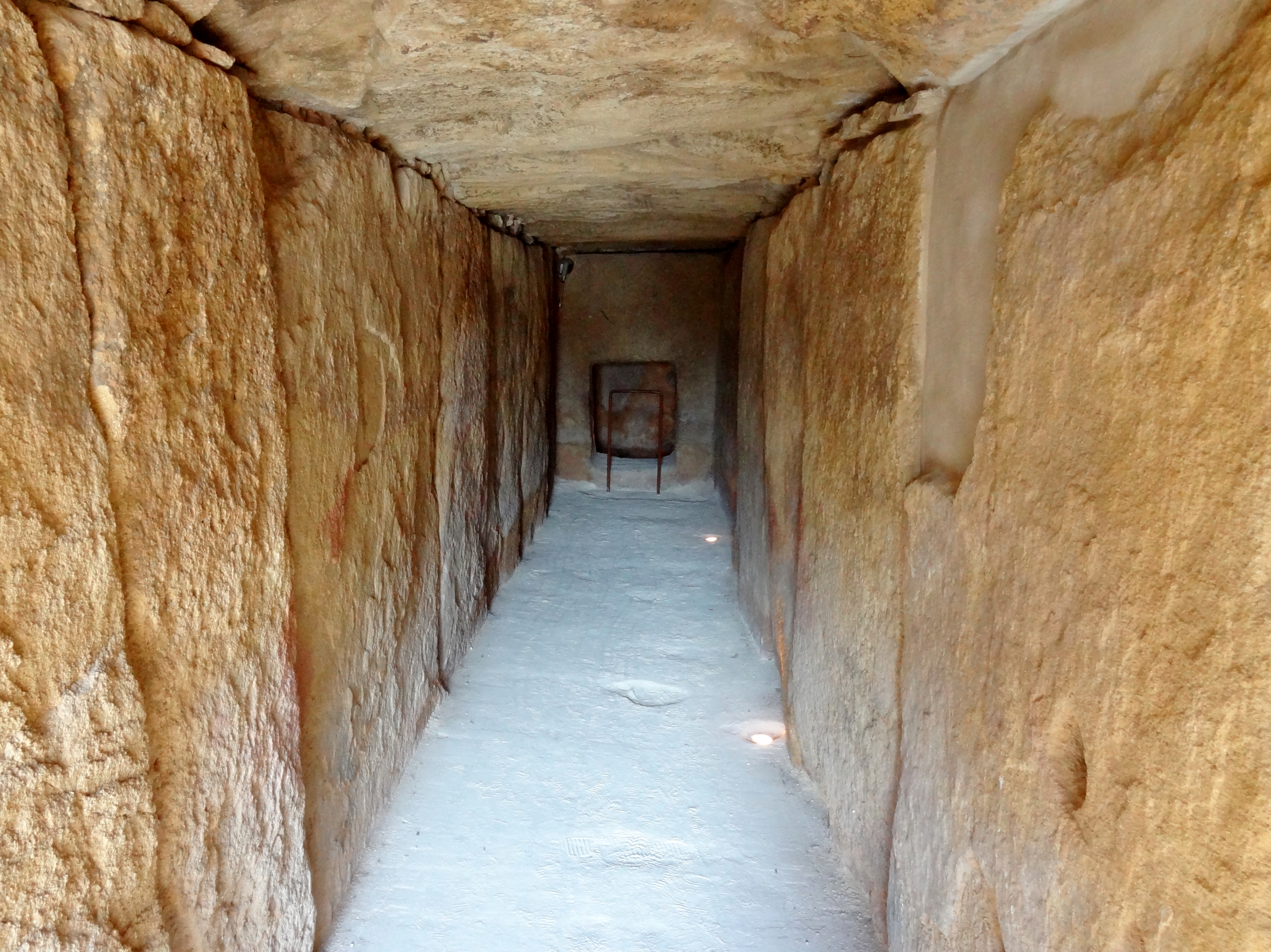
Dolmen of Viera

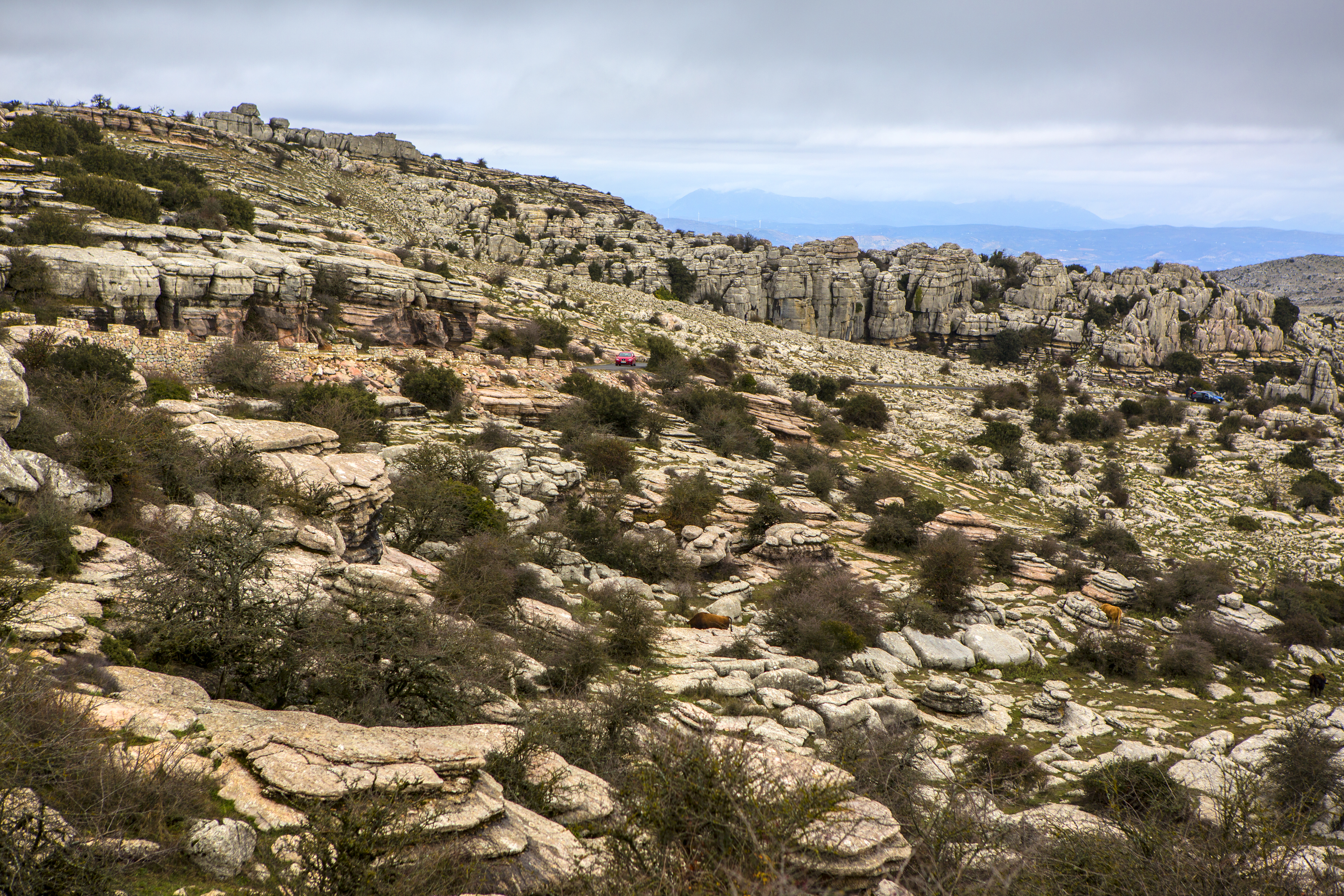
El Torcal

== See also ==
- Prehistoric Iberia
- Dolmen of Menga
- Dolmen of Viera
- Tholos of El Romeral
- Dolmen de Soto
- Dolmen de la Pastora
- Megalithic Monuments of Alcalar
- Peña de los Enamorados
- El Torcal de Antequera
- Antequera

== Bibliography ==
- Michael Hoskin (15 July 2016). "The Dolmens of Antequera". Diario Sur (in Spanish).
- Victoria Eugenia Pérez Nebreda (2015). The Antequera Dolmens Site closer to being inscribed on the List World Heritage Sites of UNESCO. Junta de Andalucía (Regional Government of Andalusia): Ministry of Culture / Instituto Andaluz del Patrimonio Histórico. pp. 21–31.
- Bartolomé Ruiz González (2014). Iter de la candidatura (PDF). Vol. II-7. Seville: Junta de Andalucía (Regional Government of Andalusia): Ministry of Culture.
- Bartolomé Ruiz González (2014). Analytical Summary of the candidacy (PDF). Seville: Junta de Andalucía (Regional Government of Andalusia): Ministry of Culture.
- Margarita Sánchez Romero (2012). Registration of the dolmens of Antequera in the Tentative List of UNESCO World Heritage Sites. Junta de Andalucía (Regional Government of Andalusia): Ministry of Culture. pp. 219–222.
- Aurora Villalobos Gómez (2015). Antequera Dolmens Site. Intuition and intention in the work by Javier Pérez González (PDF). Antequera: Junta de Andalucía (Regional Government of Andalusia): Ministry of Culture.
