= Dolmen of Menga =

Megalithic burial mound in Andalusia, Spain

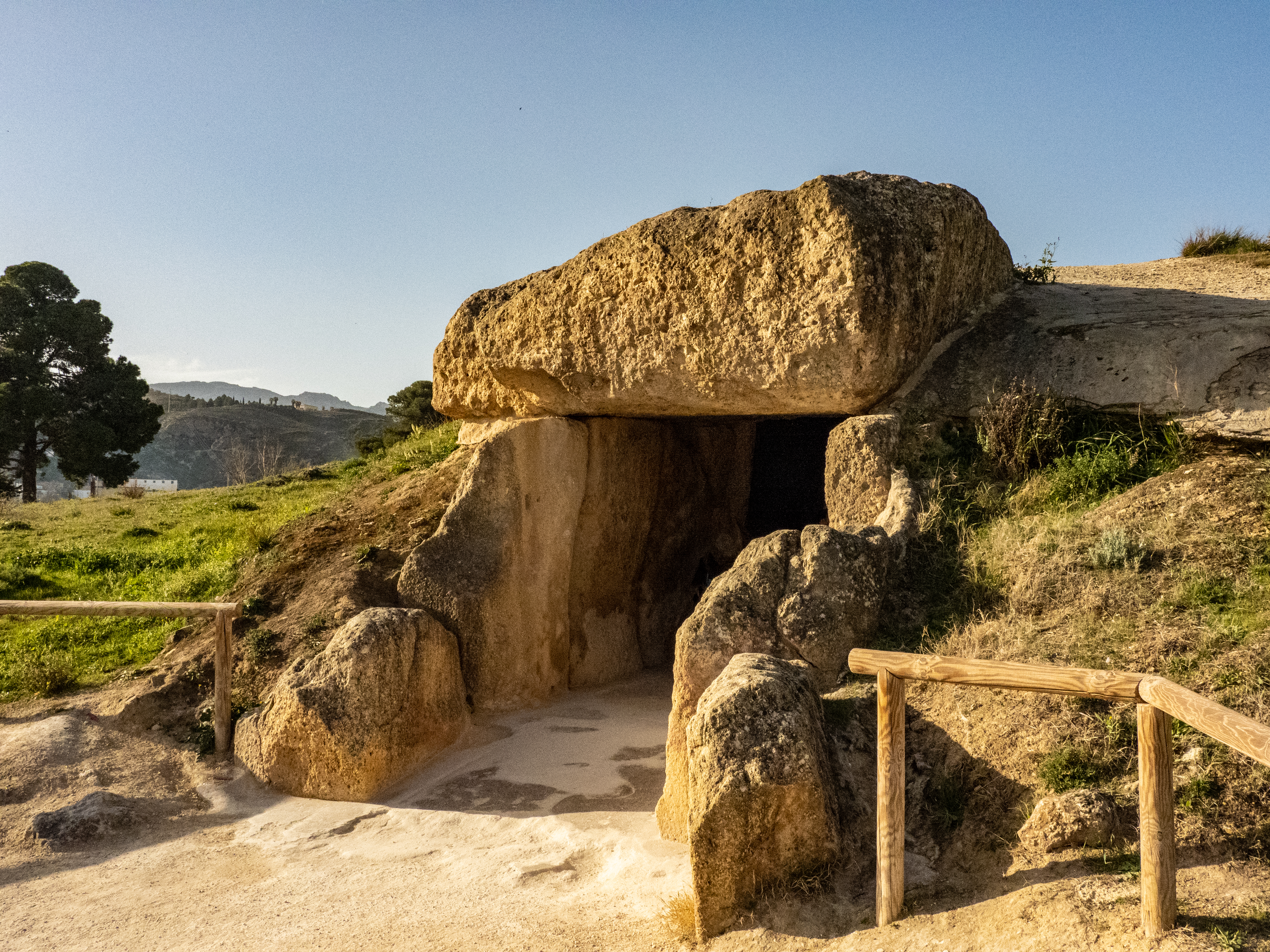
- Dolmen of Menga entrance
- Interactive map of Dolmen of Menga
- Location: Antequera, Andalusia, Spain
- Coordinates: 37°01′28.51″N 4°32′46.65″W
- Height: 3.5 meters
- Built: c. 3700 BC

UNESCO World Heritage Site
- Official name: Antequera Dolmens Site
- Type: Cultural
- Criteria: i, iii, iv
- Designated: 2016 (40th session)
- Reference no.: 1501
- Region: Europe and North America

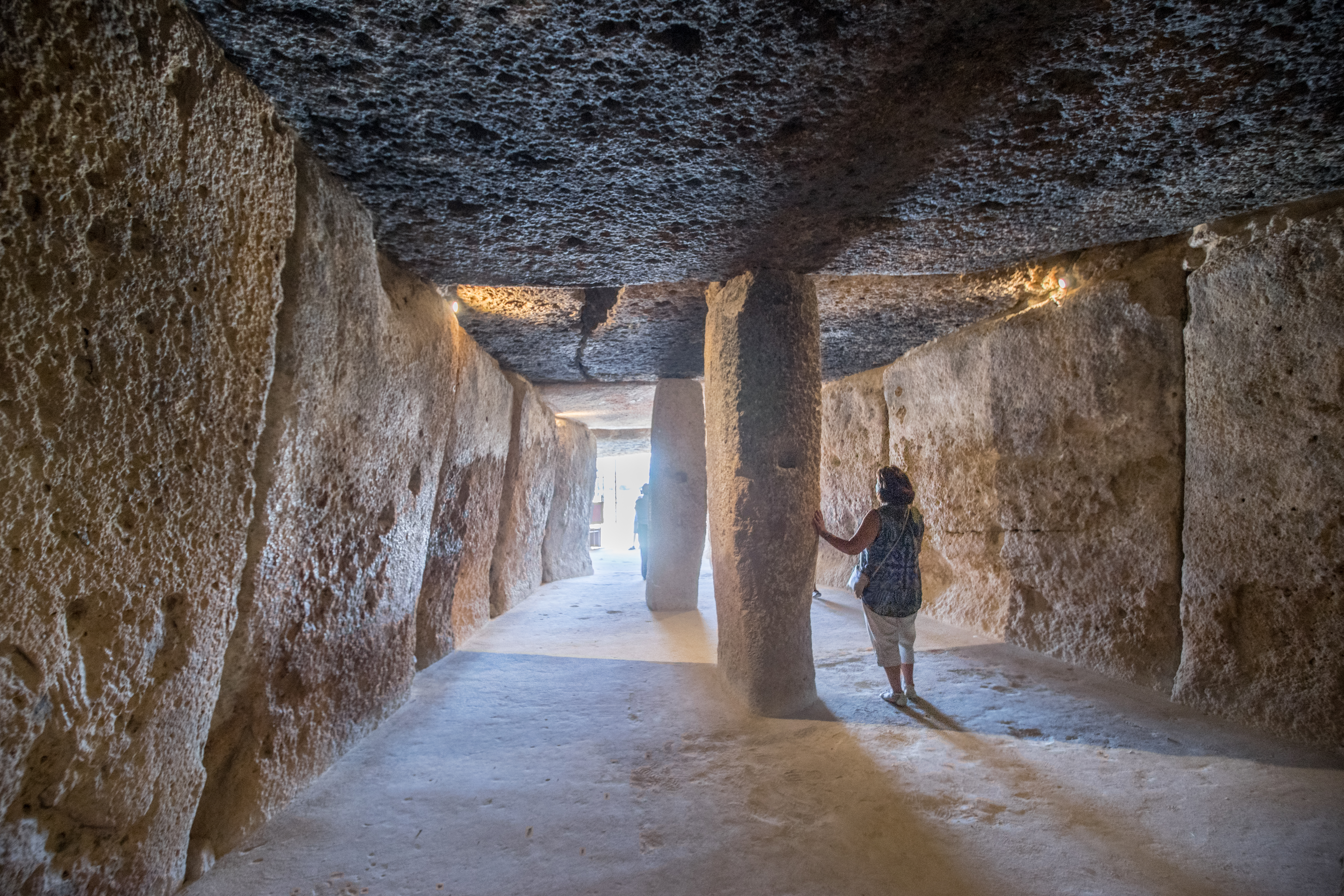
Interior of the dolmen, looking outwards

The Dolmen of Menga (Spanish: Dolmen de Menga) is a megalithic burial mound called a tumulus, a long barrow form of dolmen, dating from the Neolithic period around 3750–3650 BCE. It is near Antequera, Málaga, Spain.

It is one of the largest known ancient megalithic structures in Europe. It is 27.5 metres (90 ft) long, 6 metres (20 ft) wide and 3.5 metres (11 ft) high, and was built with thirty-two megaliths, the largest weighing about 180 tonnes (200 tons).

After completion of the chamber (which probably served as a grave for the ruling families) and the path leading into the center, the stone structure was covered with soil and built up into the hill that can be seen today. When the grave was opened and examined in the 19th century, archaeologists found the skeletons of several hundred people inside.

The dolmen sits 70 metres (230 ft) from the Dolmen de Viera and about 4 kilometres (2.5 mi) from another subterranean structure known as Tholos de El Romeral.

In 2016, the dolmens of Menga, Viera, and El Romeral were all inscribed as a UNESCO World Heritage Site under the name Antequera Dolmens Site.

== Abrigo de Matacabras ==
The Abrigo (shelter) of Matacabras, located at the foot of the northwest face of the Peña de los Enamorados, is closely linked with the Dolmen of Menga whose central axis points directly to it. The tomb is orientated to the northeast, north of the sunrise on the summer solstice, and is the only known tomb so oriented in Europe in this cultural context.

In 2018, the ATLAS research group from the University of Seville published a study of the high resolution analysis of Abrigo de Matacabras's schematic style cave paintings. The small cave has both visual and symbolic links to the Menga dolmen, establishing landscape relationships that are possibly unique in European prehistory. The results confirmed the Neolithic chronology of the cave “probably, at least, at the beginning of the 4th millennium BC... and its importance as a place of reference for the Neolithic (and possibly even older) population of the region...”

== Gallery ==
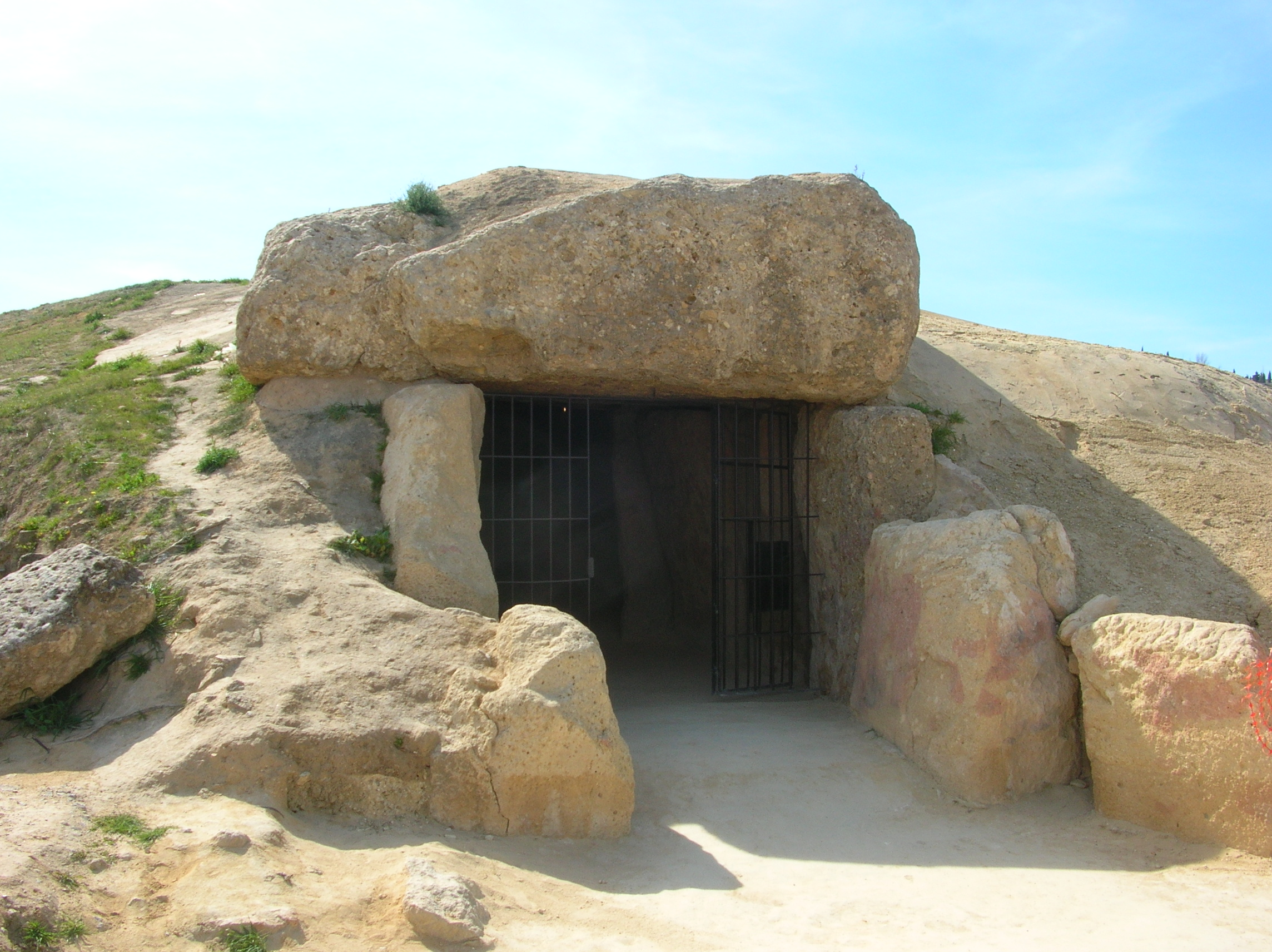
Entrance

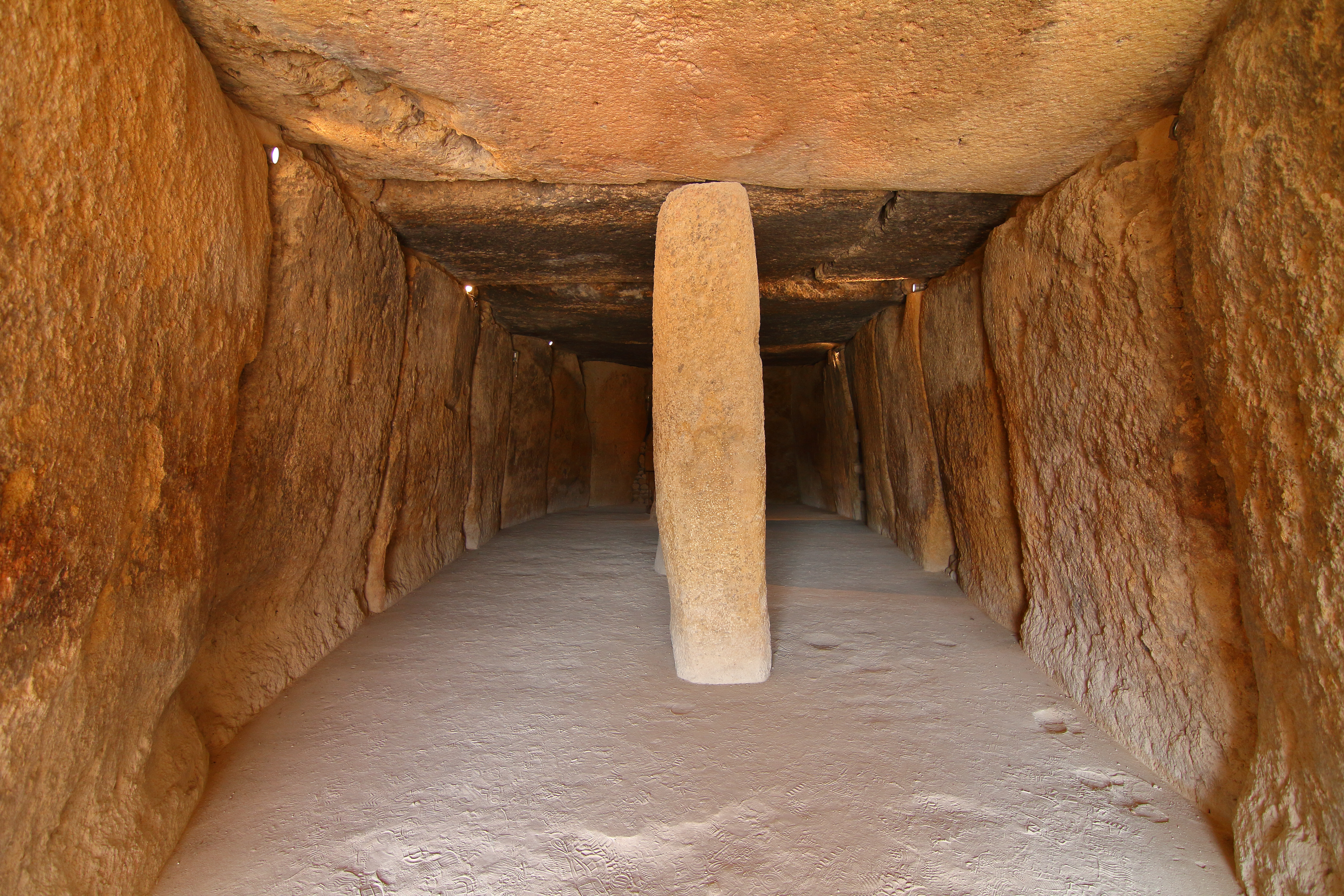
View inside from the entrance

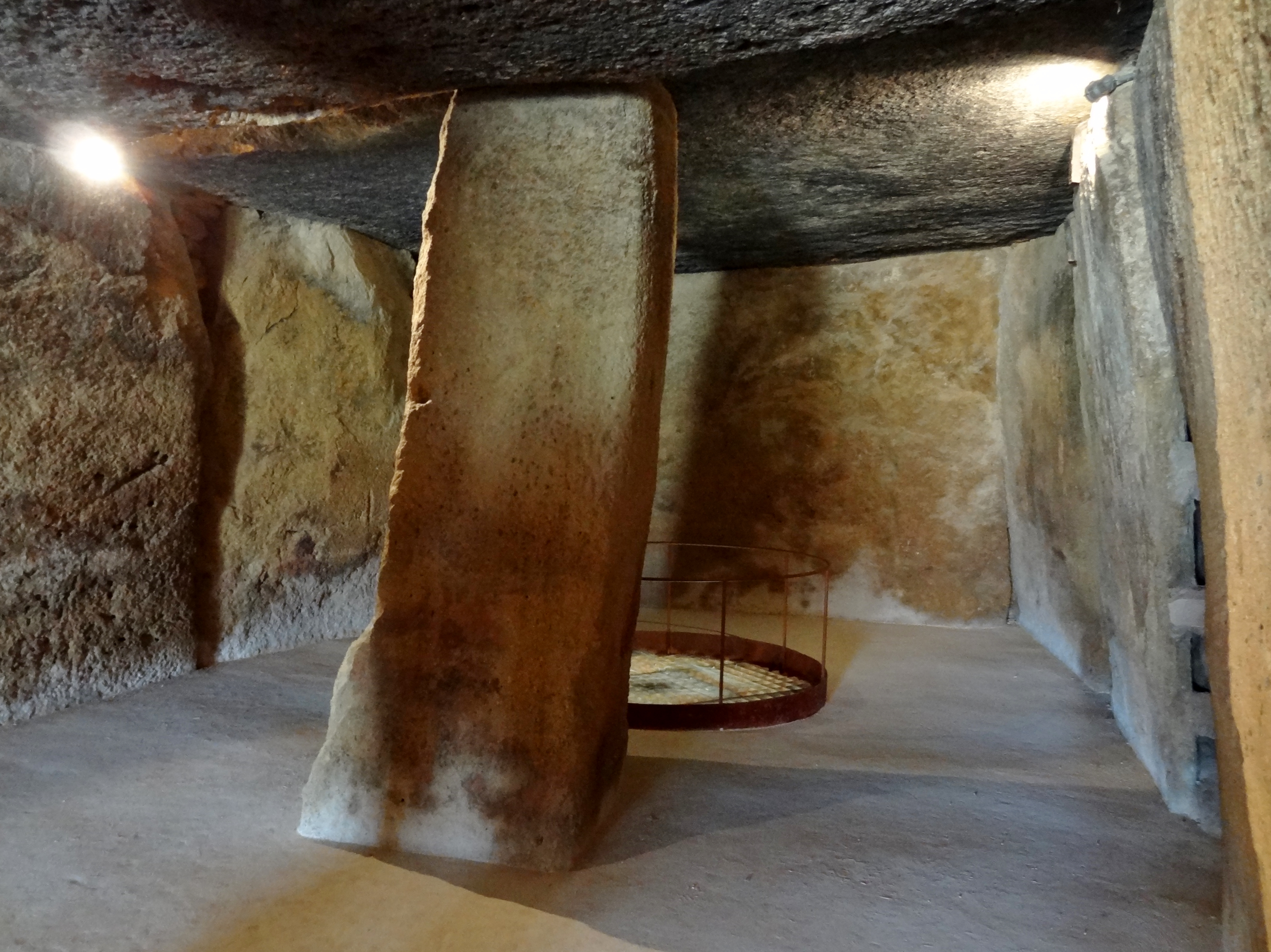
Back of the chamber with well

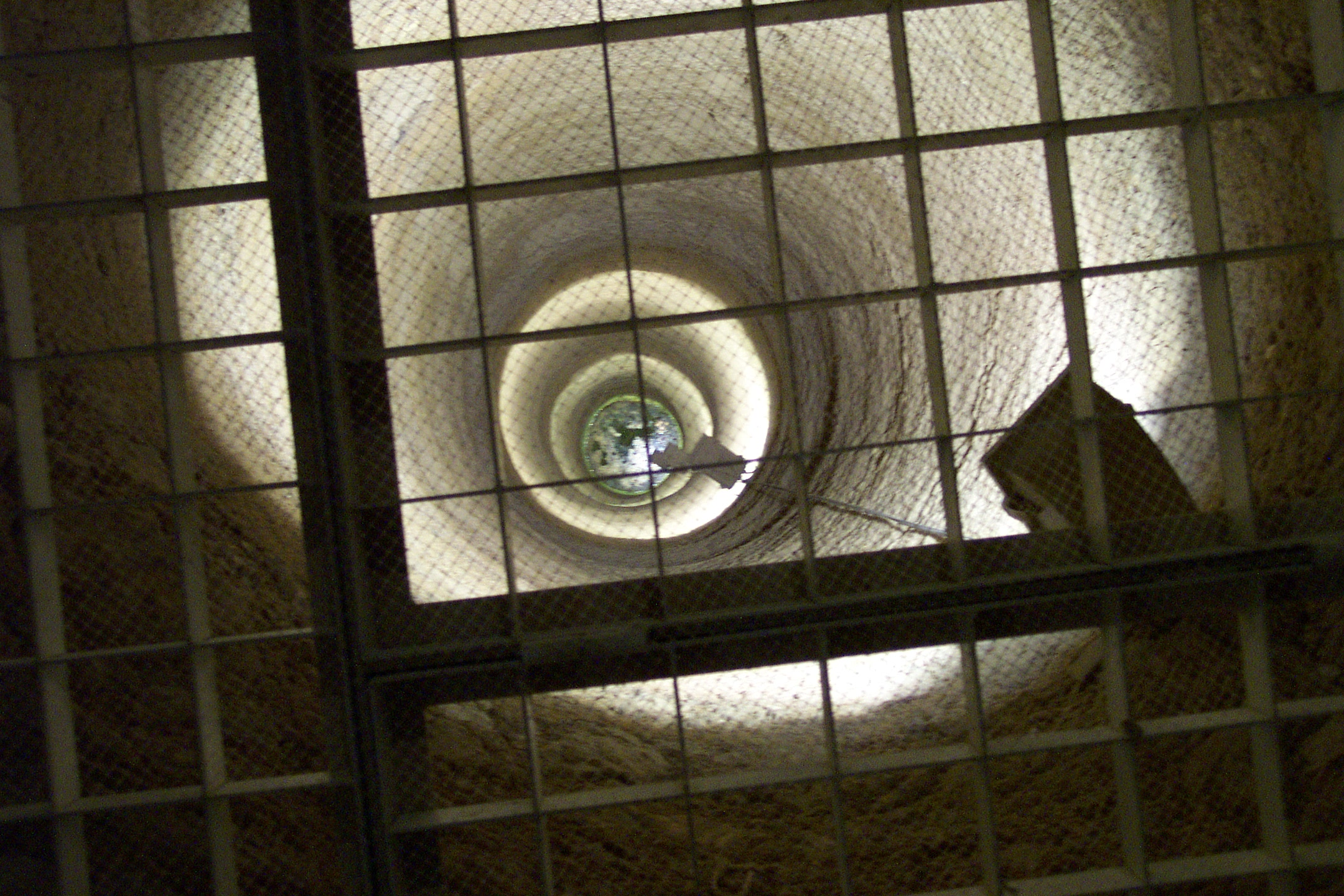
view inside the well

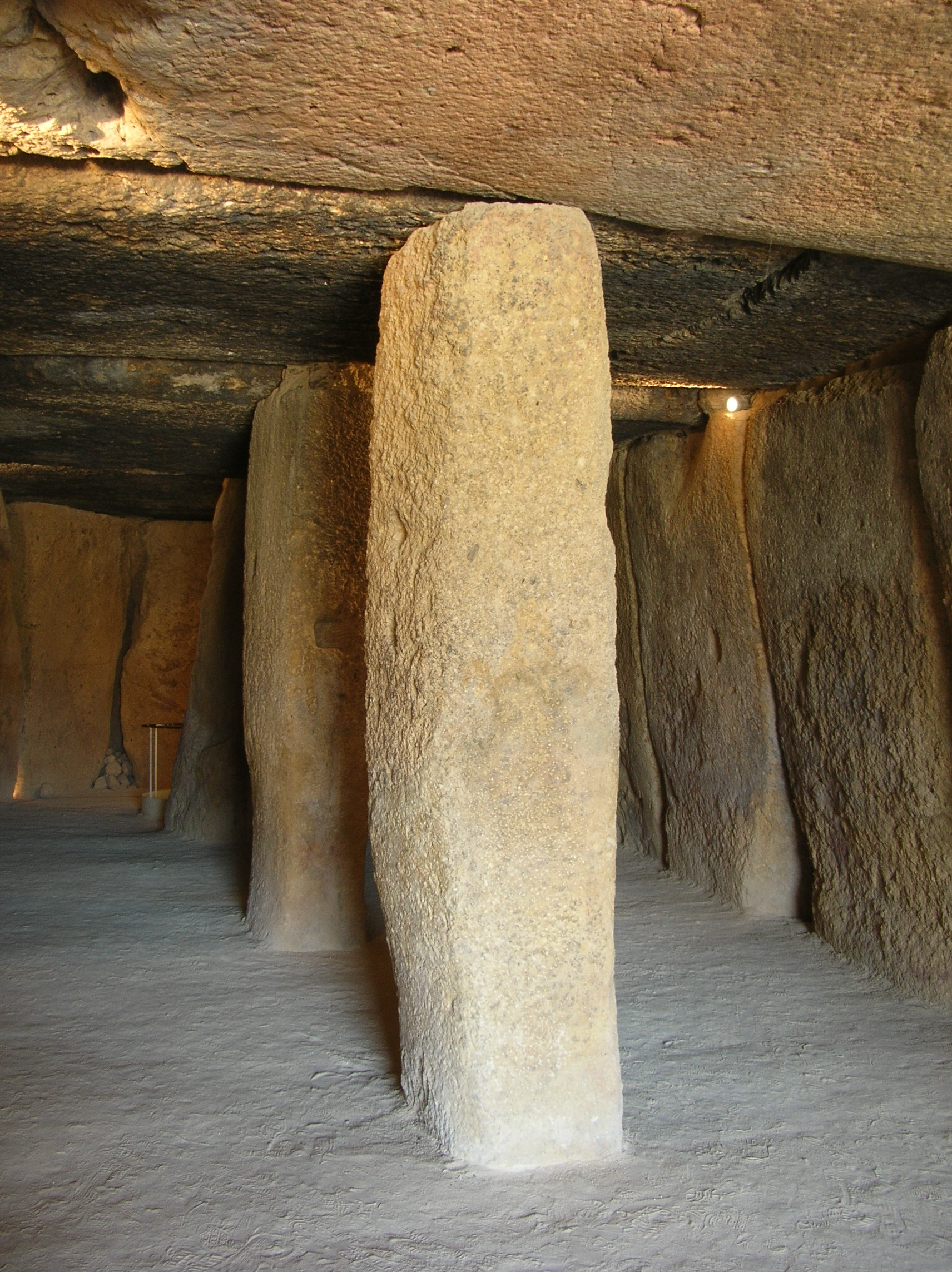
Interior of the chamber

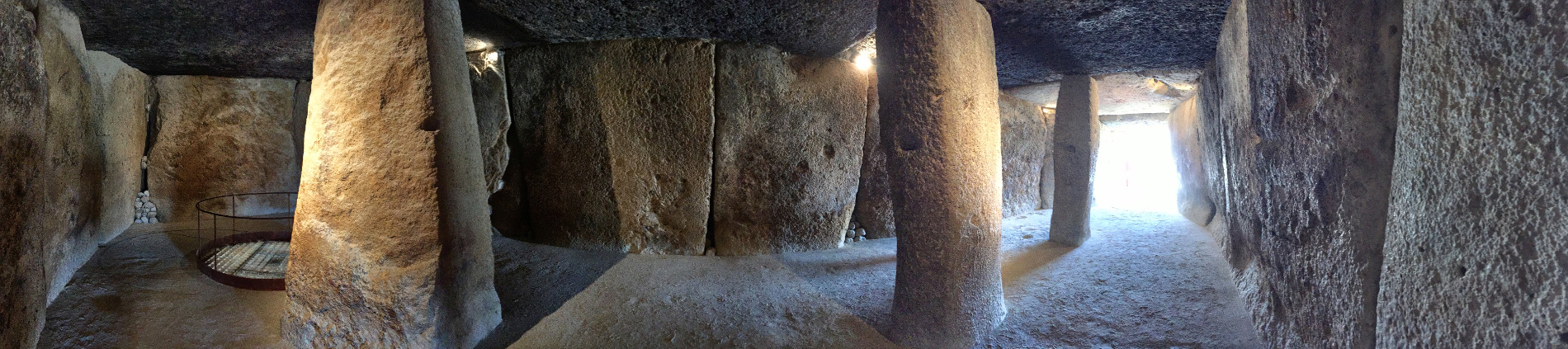
Panoramic view

== See also ==
- List of megalithic sites
- Antequera Dolmens Site
- Dolmen de Viera
- Dolmen de Soto
