= El Torcal de Antequera =

Coordinates: 36°57′49″N 4°32′44″W

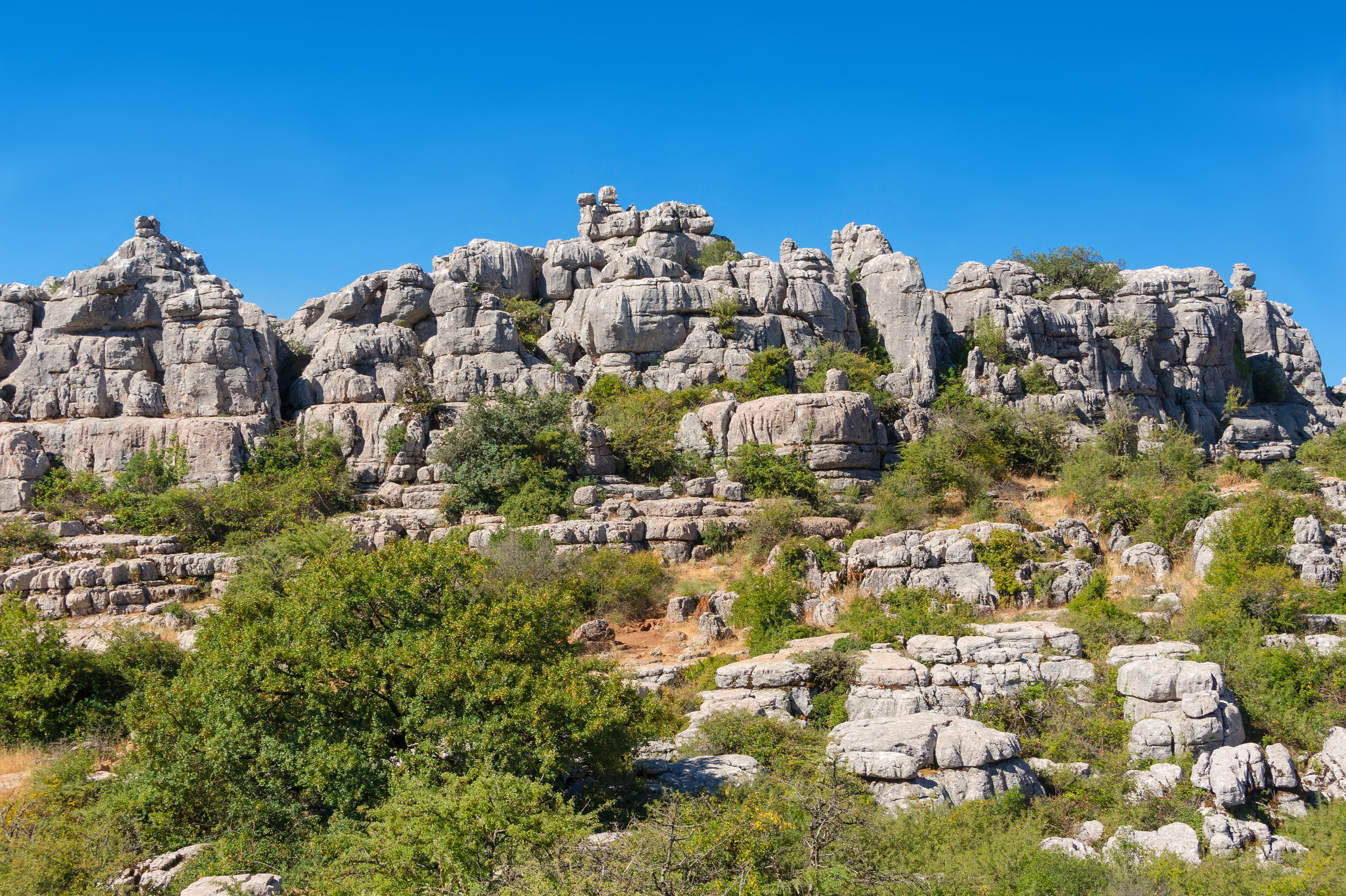
- Karst in the Torcal de Antequera

UNESCO World Heritage Site
- Official name: Antequera Dolmens Site
- Type: Cultural
- Criteria: i, iii, iv
- Designated: 2016 (40th session)
- Reference no.: 1501-002
- Region: Europe and North America

El Torcal de Antequera is a nature reserve in the Sierra del Torcal mountain range located south of the city of Antequera, in the province of Málaga of the A45 road in Andalusia, Spain. It is known for its unusual landforms and is regarded as one of the most impressive karst landscapes in Europe. The area was designated a Natural Site of National Interest in July 1929, and a Natural Park Reserve of about 17 square kilometres was created in October 1978.

== Geology ==
The Sierra del Torcal (or El Torcal) is a small mountain range separating the cities of Antequera and Málaga. It has four geological sections: Sierra Pelada, Torcal Alto, Torcal Bajo, and Tajos and Laderas. The highest point in El Torcal is Camorro de las Siete Mesas (1336 m) in the Torcal Alto.

The Jurassic age limestone is about 150 million years old and was laid down in a marine corridor that extended from the Gulf of Cádiz to Alicante between the present Atlantic Ocean and the Mediterranean Sea. These seabeds were uplifted to an elevation of over 1300 meters during the Tertiary era, resulting in a modest mountain range of flat-lying limestone, which is rare in Andalucia. Later, a series of fractures, cracks and faults at right angles (generally NW-SE and NE-SW) were exploited by erosion and produced the alleys between large blocks of limestone visible today. The blocks themselves have been subjected to both dissolution by water (karstification) and freeze-thaw splitting action which, working on the limestone's horizontal beds, resulted in the various shapes visible today, many of which resemble, and have been named after, everyday objects such as the Sphinx, the Jug, the Camel, the Screw, etc. Other flat surfaces have been karstified into rugged, rocky lands where travel on foot is difficult.

Like many massive limestones, the Torcal includes caves and other underground forms, some of them of historical importance like the Cueva del Toro (Cave of the Bull) with its Neolithic artifacts. Their origins are also related to the dissolution of underground limestone by rainwater.

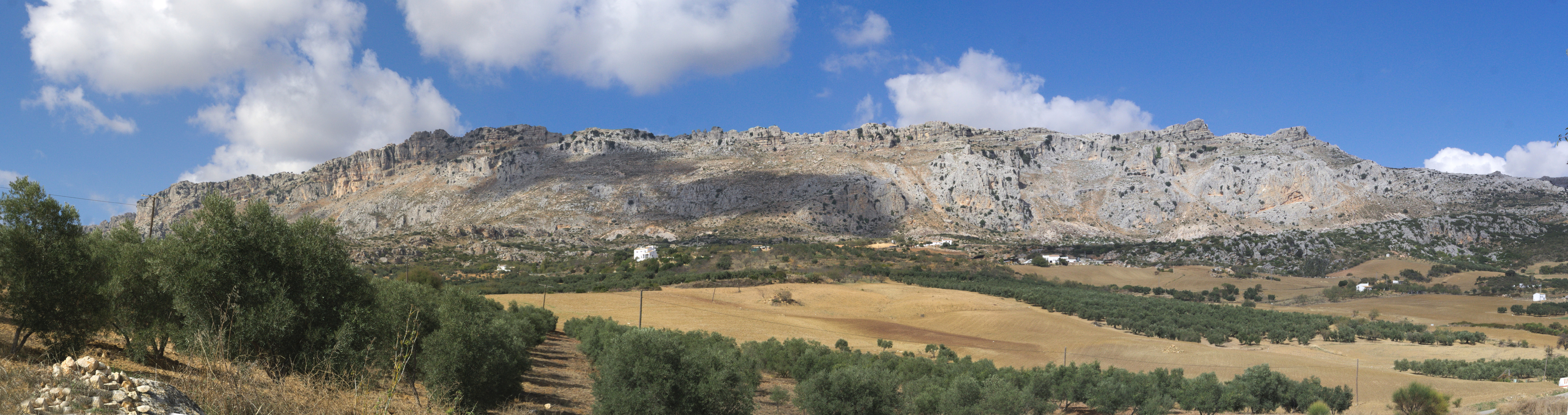
El Torcal Massif from the south

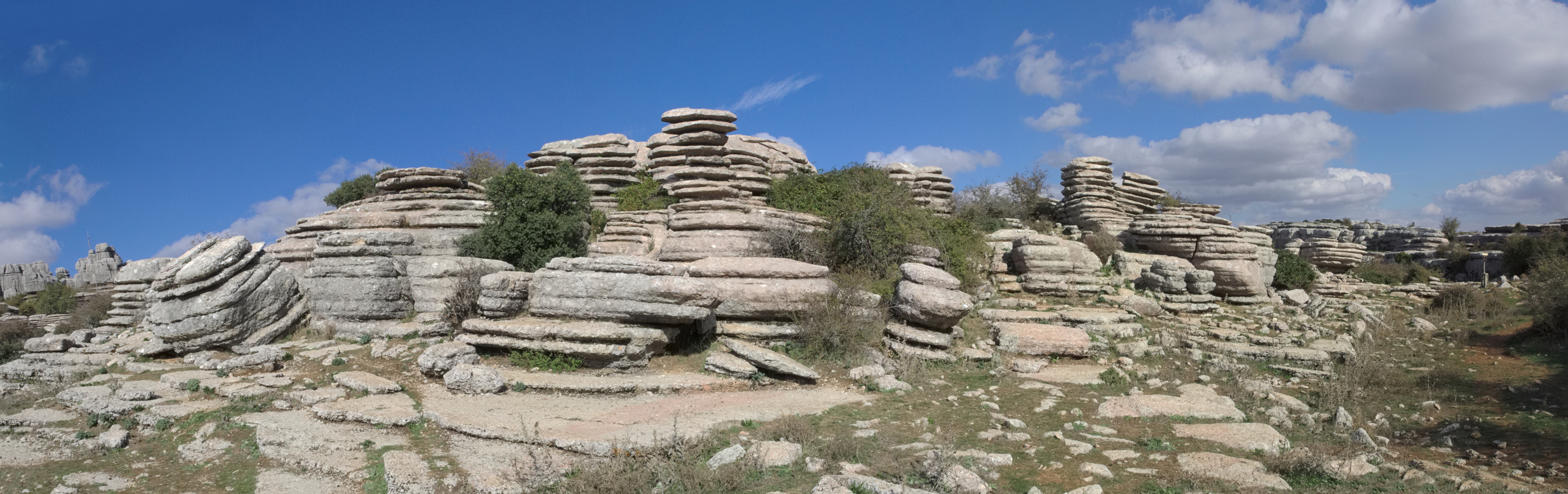
"Tornillo" (screw) rock formation

== Biology ==
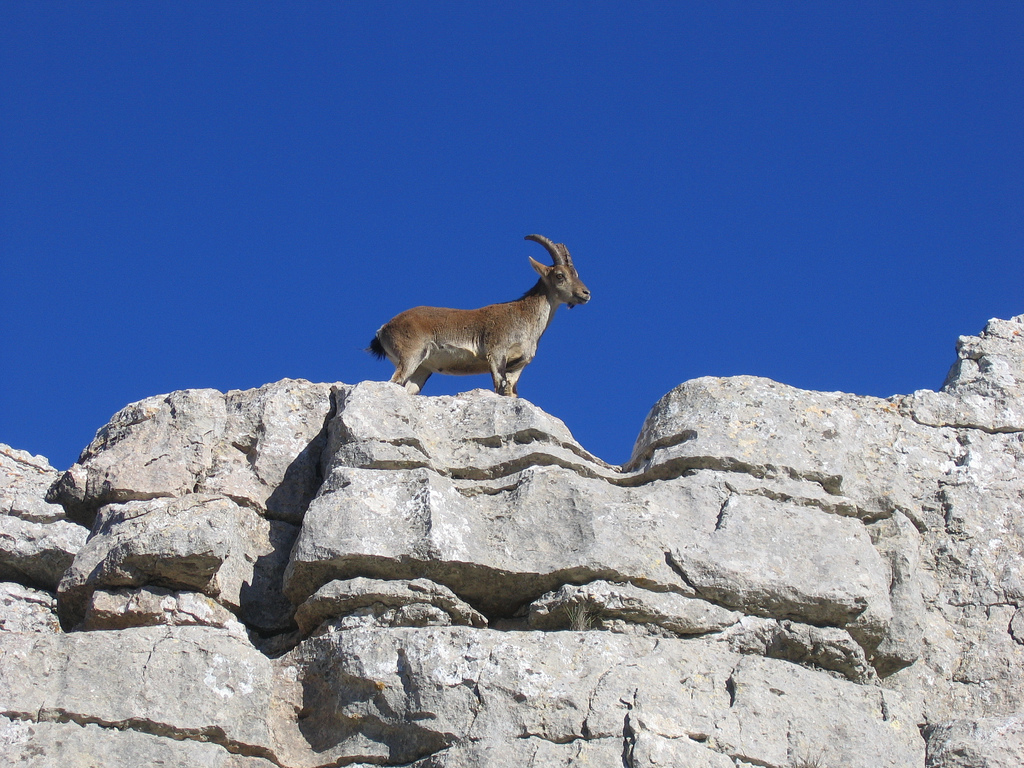
Spanish ibex, Torcal de Antequera

El Torcal supports an impressive array of wildflowers including rock-dwellers such as Linaria anticaria, Saxifraga biternata, Linaria oblongifolia, Viola demetria, Saxifraga reuterana, Polypodium australe, and other plants like lilies, red peonies, wild rose trees and thirty varieties of orchid. The many species of reptiles include the Montpellier snake and ocellated lizard. Other life includes the Griffon vulture, the Spanish ibex (Andalusian mountain goat), and nocturnal mammals such as badgers, weasels and rodents.

== Visitor facilities ==
El Torcal is accessible by paved road from the village of Villanueva de la Concepción. A small gift shop and interpretive center at the parking area is the starting point for a short walk to an impressive viewpoint and three color-coded hiking trails of 1.5 km, 2.5 km and 4.5 km length which include many scenic viewpoints.

Because of temperature extremes, most visitation occurs in the spring and fall.

== See also ==
- List of Sites of Community Importance in Andalusia
