= List of Sites of Community Importance in Andalusia =

This is a list of Sites of Community Importance in Andalusia.

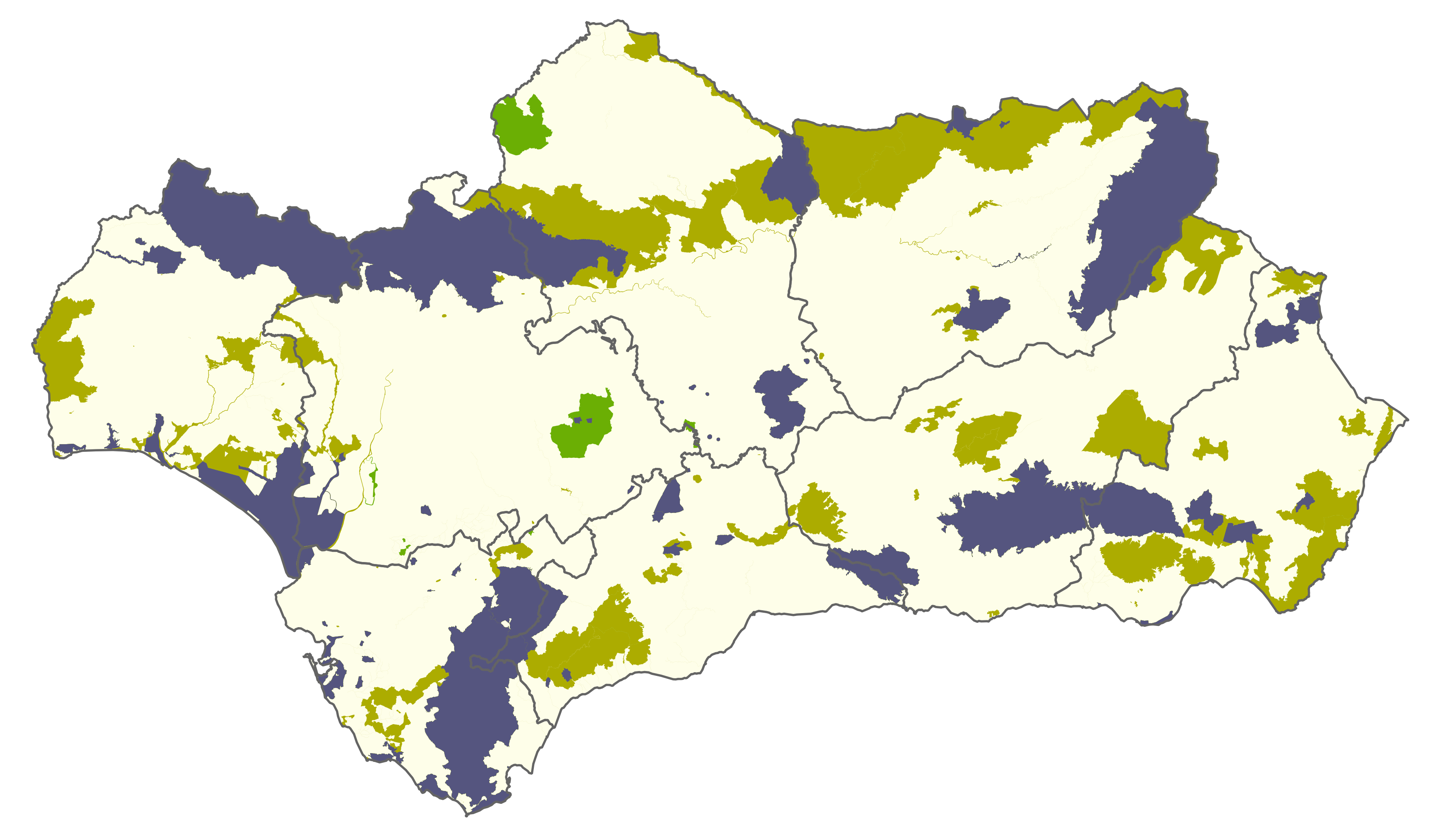
Natura 2000 sites in Andalusia Special Protection Area (SPA) Sites of Community Importance (SCI) Both, SPA and SCI.

ID	Name	Coordinates	Image
ES0000024	Doñana National Park (official name: Doñana); Other names: n/a	37.0165°N 6.4767°W	Looks like this Site of Community Interest has an image. Don't worry, you can take one of your own, and upload it too!
ES0000025	Marismas del Odiel (official name: Marismas del Odiel); Other names: n/a	37.1675°N 6.9275°W	Looks like this Site of Community Interest has an image. Don't worry, you can take one of your own, and upload it too!
ES0000026	Complejo endorreico de Espera (official name: Complejo endorreico de Espera); Other names: n/a	36.8669°N 5.8639°W	Looks like this Site of Community Interest has an image. Don't worry, you can take one of your own, and upload it too!
ES0000027	Laguna de Medina (official name: Laguna de Medina); Other names: n/a	36.6137°N 6.0472°W	Looks like this Site of Community Interest has an image. Don't worry, you can take one of your own, and upload it too!
ES0000028	Complejo endorreico de Chiclana (official name: Complejo endorreico de Chiclana); Other names: n/a	36.4478°N 6.0769°W	Looks like this Site of Community Interest has an image. Don't worry, you can take one of your own, and upload it too!
ES0000029	Complejo endorreico del Puerto de Santa María (official name: Complejo endorreico del Puerto de Santa María); Other names: n/a	36.6444°N 6.2302°W	This Site of Community Interest has no photo. Take one and upload it! Thanks!
ES0000030	Complejo endorreico de Puerto Real (official name: Complejo endorreico de Puerto Real); Other names: n/a	36.526°N 6.0403°W	Looks like this Site of Community Interest has an image. Don't worry, you can take one of your own, and upload it too!
ES0000031	Sierra de Grazalema Natural Park (official name: Sierra de Grazalema); Other names: n/a	36.7085°N 5.3709°W	Looks like this Site of Community Interest has an image. Don't worry, you can take one of your own, and upload it too!
ES0000032	El Torcal de Antequera (official name: Torcal de Antequera); Other names: n/a	36.9656°N 4.5414°W	Looks like this Site of Community Interest has an image. Don't worry, you can take one of your own, and upload it too!
ES0000033	Fuente de Piedra Lagoon (official name: Laguna de Fuente de Piedra); Other names: n/a	37.1035°N 4.7861°W	Looks like this Site of Community Interest has an image. Don't worry, you can take one of your own, and upload it too!
ES0000034	Sierras de Cazorla, Segura y Las Villas Natural Park (official name: Lagunas del Sur de Cordoba); Other names: n/a	37.4808°N 4.6924°W	Looks like this Site of Community Interest has an image. Don't worry, you can take one of your own, and upload it too!
ES0000035	Sierras de Cazorla, Segura y Las Villas (official name: Sierras de Cazorla, Segura y Las Villas); Other names: n/a	38.0985°N 2.7635°W	Looks like this Site of Community Interest has an image. Don't worry, you can take one of your own, and upload it too!
ES0000045	Sierra Alhamilla (official name: Sierra Alhamilla); Other names: n/a	36.9638°N 2.347°W	Looks like this Site of Community Interest has an image. Don't worry, you can take one of your own, and upload it too!
ES0000046	Cabo de Gata-Níjar Natural Park (official name: Cabo de Gata-Níjar); Other names: n/a	36.8239°N 2.0958°W	Looks like this Site of Community Interest has an image. Don't worry, you can take one of your own, and upload it too!
ES0000047	Tabernas Desert (official name: Desierto de Tabernas); Other names: n/a	37.0249°N 2.5055°W	Looks like this Site of Community Interest has an image. Don't worry, you can take one of your own, and upload it too!
ES0000048	Punta Entinas-Sabinar (official name: Punta Entinas-Sabinar); Other names: n/a	36.6893°N 2.7065°W	Looks like this Site of Community Interest has an image. Don't worry, you can take one of your own, and upload it too!
ES0000049	Los Alcornocales Natural Park (official name: Los Alcornocales); Other names: n/a	36.36686°N 5.580237°W	Looks like this Site of Community Interest has an image. Don't worry, you can take one of your own, and upload it too!
ES0000050	Sierra de Hornachuelos (official name: Sierra de Hornachuelos); Other names: n/a	37.906828°N 5.244229°W	Looks like this Site of Community Interest has an image. Don't worry, you can take one of your own, and upload it too!
ES0000051	Sierra de Aracena and Picos de Aroche Natural Park (official name: Sierra de Aracena y Picos de Aroche); Other names: n/a	37.9429°N 6.5623°W	Looks like this Site of Community Interest has an image. Don't worry, you can take one of your own, and upload it too!
ES0000052	Sierra Pelada y Rivera del Aserrador (official name: Sierra Pelada y Rivera del Aserrador); Other names: n/a	37.8431°N 7.0732°W	This Site of Community Interest has no photo. Take one and upload it! Thanks!
ES0000053	Sierra Norte (official name: Sierra Norte); Other names: n/a	37.945595°N 5.768985°W	Looks like this Site of Community Interest has an image. Don't worry, you can take one of your own, and upload it too!
ES0000140	Bahía de Cádiz Natural Park (official name: Bahía de Cádiz); Other names: n/a	36.4012°N 6.1908°W	Looks like this Site of Community Interest has an image. Don't worry, you can take one of your own, and upload it too!
ES0000337	El Estrecho Natural Park (official name: Estrecho); Other names: n/a	36.0654°N 5.7187°W	Looks like this Site of Community Interest has an image. Don't worry, you can take one of your own, and upload it too!
ES6110001	Albufera de Adra (official name: Albufera de Adra); Other names: n/a	36.753°N 2.9521°W	This Site of Community Interest has no photo. Take one and upload it! Thanks!
ES6110002	Karst en Yesos de Sorbas (official name: Karst en Yesos de Sorbas); Other names: n/a	37.0837°N 2.0721°W	Looks like this Site of Community Interest has an image. Don't worry, you can take one of your own, and upload it too!
ES6110003	Sierra de María-Los Vélez Natural Park (official name: Sierra Maria - Los Vélez); Other names: n/a	37.6754°N 2.141°W	Looks like this Site of Community Interest has an image. Don't worry, you can take one of your own, and upload it too!
ES6110004	Sierra del Oso (official name: Sierra del Oso); Other names: n/a	37.843°N 2.1013°W	This Site of Community Interest has no photo. Take one and upload it! Thanks!
ES6110005	Sierra de Cabrera-Bédar (official name: Sierra de Cabrera-Bédar); Other names: n/a	37.102°N 2.0197°W	Looks like this Site of Community Interest has an image. Don't worry, you can take one of your own, and upload it too!
ES6110006	Ramblas de Gérgal, Tabernas y Sur de Sierra Alhamilla (official name: Ramblas de Gérgal, Tabernas y Sur de Sierra Alhamilla); Other names: n/a	36.9764°N 2.4658°W	Looks like this Site of Community Interest has an image. Don't worry, you can take one of your own, and upload it too!
ES6110007	La Serreta de Cabo de Gata (official name: La Serreta de Cabo de Gata); Other names: n/a	36.8796°N 2.1415°W	Looks like this Site of Community Interest has an image. Don't worry, you can take one of your own, and upload it too!
ES6110008	Sierras de Gádor y Énix (official name: Sierras de Gádor y Énix); Other names: n/a	36.8736°N 2.7041°W	Looks like this Site of Community Interest has an image. Don't worry, you can take one of your own, and upload it too!
ES6110011	Sierra del Alto de Almagro (official name: Sierra del Alto de Almagro); Other names: n/a	37.3586°N 1.8524°W	Looks like this Site of Community Interest has an image. Don't worry, you can take one of your own, and upload it too!
ES6110012	Sierras Almagrera, de Los Pinos y El Aguilón (official name: Sierras Almagrera, de Los Pinos y El Aguilón); Other names: n/a	37.3206°N 1.737°W	This Site of Community Interest has no photo. Take one and upload it! Thanks!
ES6110013	Calares de Sierra de Los Filabres (official name: Calares de Sierra de Los Filabres); Other names: n/a	37.2827°N 2.4779°W	Looks like this Site of Community Interest has an image. Don't worry, you can take one of your own, and upload it too!
ES6110014	Artos de El Ejido (official name: Artos de El Ejido); Other names: n/a	36.7452°N 2.7954°W	This Site of Community Interest has no photo. Take one and upload it! Thanks!
ES6110015	Alborán (official name: Alboran Island|Alborán); Other names: n/a	35.9304°N 3.0544°W	Looks like this Site of Community Interest has an image. Don't worry, you can take one of your own, and upload it too!
ES6110016	Rambla de Arejos (official name: Rambla de Arejos); Other names: n/a	37.3746°N 1.6414°W	This Site of Community Interest has no photo. Take one and upload it! Thanks!
ES6110017	Río Antas (official name: Río Antas); Other names: n/a	37.2066°N 1.8293°W	Looks like this Site of Community Interest has an image. Don't worry, you can take one of your own, and upload it too!
ES6110018	Río Adra (official name: Río Adra); Other names: n/a	36.8279°N 2.9558°W	Looks like this Site of Community Interest has an image. Don't worry, you can take one of your own, and upload it too!
ES6110020	Islote de San Andrés (official name: Islote de San Andrés); Other names: n/a	36.993°N 1.8859°W	Looks like this Site of Community Interest has an image. Don't worry, you can take one of your own, and upload it too!
ES6120001	Cola del Embalse de Arcos (official name: Cola del Embalse de Arcos); Other names: n/a	36.7661°N 5.7846°W	Looks like this Site of Community Interest has an image. Don't worry, you can take one of your own, and upload it too!
ES6120002	Cola del Embalse de Bornos (official name: Cola del Embalse de Bornos); Other names: n/a	36.8122°N 5.6804°W	Looks like this Site of Community Interest has an image. Don't worry, you can take one of your own, and upload it too!
ES6120003	Estuario del Río Guadiaro (official name: Estuario del Río Guadiaro); Other names: n/a	36.2815°N 5.2811°W	Looks like this Site of Community Interest has an image. Don't worry, you can take one of your own, and upload it too!
ES6120006	Marismas del Río Palmones (official name: Marismas del Río Palmones); Other names: n/a	36.1714°N 5.4408°W	Looks like this Site of Community Interest has an image. Don't worry, you can take one of your own, and upload it too!
ES6120008	La Breña y Marismas del Barbate Natural Park (official name: La Breña y Marismas del Barbate); Other names: n/a	36.182985°N 5.975289°W	Looks like this Site of Community Interest has an image. Don't worry, you can take one of your own, and upload it too!
ES6120009	Fondos Marinos de Bahía de Cádiz (official name: Fondos Marinos de Bahía de Cádiz); Other names: n/a	36.5631°N 6.2746°W	This Site of Community Interest has no photo. Take one and upload it! Thanks!
ES6120011	Laguna de Los Tollos (official name: Laguna de Los Tollos); Other names: n/a	36.8437°N 6.0165°W	Looks like this Site of Community Interest has an image. Don't worry, you can take one of your own, and upload it too!
ES6120013	Sierra Líjar (official name: Sierra Líjar); Other names: n/a	36.9157°N 5.4531°W	Looks like this Site of Community Interest has an image. Don't worry, you can take one of your own, and upload it too!
ES6120014	Laguna de Las Canteras y El Tejón (official name: Laguna de Las Canteras y El Tejón); Other names: n/a	36.5812°N 6.0710000000000015°W	This Site of Community Interest has no photo. Take one and upload it! Thanks!
ES6120015	Acebuchales de La Campiña Sur de Cádiz (official name: Acebuchales de La Campiña Sur de Cádiz); Other names: n/a	36.3234°N 5.879°W	This Site of Community Interest has no photo. Take one and upload it! Thanks!
ES6120017	Punta de Trafalgar (official name: Punta de Trafalgar); Other names: n/a	36.1759°N 6.0377°W	Looks like this Site of Community Interest has an image. Don't worry, you can take one of your own, and upload it too!
ES6120018	Pinar de Roche (official name: Pinar de Roche); Other names: n/a	36.314532°N 6.120607°W	Looks like this Site of Community Interest has an image. Don't worry, you can take one of your own, and upload it too!
ES6120019	Río Salado de Conil (official name: Río Salado de Conil); Other names: n/a	36.3286°N 5.9438°W	Looks like this Site of Community Interest has an image. Don't worry, you can take one of your own, and upload it too!
ES6120020	Túnel III de Bornos (official name: Túnel III de Bornos); Other names: n/a	36.8024°N 5.7549°W	This Site of Community Interest has no photo. Take one and upload it! Thanks!
ES6120021	Río Guadalete (official name: Río Guadalete); Other names: n/a	36.9205°N 5.5557°W	Looks like this Site of Community Interest has an image. Don't worry, you can take one of your own, and upload it too!
ES6120022	Búnker del Tufillo (official name: Búnker del Tufillo); Other names: n/a	36.0734°N 5.6822°W	This Site of Community Interest has no photo. Take one and upload it! Thanks!
ES6120023	Corrales de Rota (official name: Corrales de Rota); Other names: n/a	36.628°N 6.3908°W	Looks like this Site of Community Interest has an image. Don't worry, you can take one of your own, and upload it too!
ES6120024	Cueva del Búho (official name: Cueva del Búho); Other names: n/a	36.8108°N 5.5967°W	This Site of Community Interest has no photo. Take one and upload it! Thanks!
ES6120025	Río Iro (official name: Río Iro); Other names: n/a	36.409°N 6.0364°W	Looks like this Site of Community Interest has an image. Don't worry, you can take one of your own, and upload it too!
ES6120026	Cueva de las Mesas de Algar (official name: Cueva de las Mesas de Algar); Other names: n/a	36.3523°N 5.9068°W	This Site of Community Interest has no photo. Take one and upload it! Thanks!
ES6120027	Salado de San Pedro (official name: Salado de San Pedro); Other names: n/a	36.5636°N 6.0769°W	Looks like this Site of Community Interest has an image. Don't worry, you can take one of your own, and upload it too!
ES6120028	Río de La Jara (official name: Río de La Jara); Other names: n/a	36.0539°N 5.6334°W	This Site of Community Interest has no photo. Take one and upload it! Thanks!
ES6120029	Búnker del Santuario de La Luz (official name: Búnker del Santuario de La Luz); Other names: n/a	36.0501°N 5.6233°W	This Site of Community Interest has no photo. Take one and upload it! Thanks!
ES6120030	Cuevas de La Mujer y de Las Colmenas (official name: Cuevas de La Mujer y de Las Colmenas); Other names: n/a	36.636°N 6.175°W	This Site of Community Interest has no photo. Take one and upload it! Thanks!
ES6120031	Ríos Guadiaro y Hozgarganta (official name: Ríos Guadiaro y Hozgarganta); Other names: n/a	36.3264°N 5.3459°W	Looks like this Site of Community Interest has an image. Don't worry, you can take one of your own, and upload it too!
ES6120033	Fondos Marinos Marismas del Río Palmones (official name: Fondos Marinos Marismas del Río Palmones); Other names: n/a	36.1671°N 5.4295°W	Looks like this Site of Community Interest has an image. Don't worry, you can take one of your own, and upload it too!
ES6120034	Fondos Marinos Estuario del Río Guadiaro (official name: Fondos Marinos Estuario del Río Guadiaro); Other names: n/a	36.2778°N 5.2706°W	This Site of Community Interest has no photo. Take one and upload it! Thanks!
ES6130001	Sierra de Cardeña y Montoro (official name: Sierra de Cardeña y Montoro); Other names: n/a	38.2347°N 4.2902°W	Looks like this Site of Community Interest has an image. Don't worry, you can take one of your own, and upload it too!
ES6130002	Sierra Subbética (official name: Sierra Subbética); Other names: n/a	37.425616°N 4.314789°W	Looks like this Site of Community Interest has an image. Don't worry, you can take one of your own, and upload it too!
ES6130003	Sierra de Santa Eufemia (official name: Sierra de Santa Eufemia); Other names: n/a	38.6375°N 4.9407°W	This Site of Community Interest has no photo. Take one and upload it! Thanks!
ES6130004	Río Guadalmez (official name: Río Guadalmez); Other names: n/a	38.4843°N 4.5997°W	This Site of Community Interest has no photo. Take one and upload it! Thanks!
ES6130005	Suroeste de La Sierra de Cardeña y Montoro (official name: Suroeste de La Sierra de Cardeña y Montoro); Other names: n/a	38.0986°N 4.3959°W	Looks like this Site of Community Interest has an image. Don't worry, you can take one of your own, and upload it too!
ES6130006	Guadalmellato (official name: Guadalmellato); Other names: n/a	37.9542°N 4.699°W	Looks like this Site of Community Interest has an image. Don't worry, you can take one of your own, and upload it too!
ES6130007	Guadiato-Bembézar (official name: Guadiato-Bembézar); Other names: n/a	37.8484°N 5.1831°W	Looks like this Site of Community Interest has an image. Don't worry, you can take one of your own, and upload it too!
ES6130008	Tramo Inferior del Río Guadajoz (official name: Tramo Inferior del Río Guadajoz); Other names: n/a	37.7931°N 4.7347°W	This Site of Community Interest has no photo. Take one and upload it! Thanks!
ES6130009	Ríos Cuzna y Gato (official name: Ríos Cuzna y Gato); Other names: n/a	38.1484°N 4.7553°W	This Site of Community Interest has no photo. Take one and upload it! Thanks!
ES6130010	Río Guadamatilla y Arroyo del Tamujar (official name: Río Guadamatilla y Arroyo del Tamujar); Other names: n/a	38.6093°N 5.0403°W	This Site of Community Interest has no photo. Take one and upload it! Thanks!
ES6130011	Río Guadamatilla (official name: Río Guadamatilla); Other names: n/a	38.4068°N 5.0777°W	This Site of Community Interest has no photo. Take one and upload it! Thanks!
ES6130012	Zújar River (official name: Río Zújar); Other names: n/a	38.5778°N 5.317°W	Looks like this Site of Community Interest has an image. Don't worry, you can take one of your own, and upload it too!
ES6130013	Barrancos del Río Retortillo (official name: Barrancos del Río Retortillo); Other names: n/a	37.819738°N 5.343826°W	This Site of Community Interest has no photo. Take one and upload it! Thanks!
ES6130014	Arroyo de Ventas Nuevas (official name: Arroyo de Ventas Nuevas); Other names: n/a	38.3675°N 4.4653°W	This Site of Community Interest has no photo. Take one and upload it! Thanks!
ES6130015	Río Guadalquivir -Tramo Medio (official name: Río Guadalquivir -Tramo Medio); Other names: n/a	37.7966°N 5.099°W	Looks like this Site of Community Interest has an image. Don't worry, you can take one of your own, and upload it too!
ES6130016	Río Guadalbarbo (official name: Río Guadalbarbo); Other names: n/a	38.1675°N 4.8659°W	This Site of Community Interest has no photo. Take one and upload it! Thanks!
ES6140001	Sierra de Baza (official name: Sierra de Baza); Other names: n/a	37.3756°N 2.8311°W	Looks like this Site of Community Interest has an image. Don't worry, you can take one of your own, and upload it too!
ES6140002	Sierra de Castril (official name: Sierra de Castril); Other names: n/a	37.8742°N 2.7717°W	Looks like this Site of Community Interest has an image. Don't worry, you can take one of your own, and upload it too!
ES6140003	Sierra de Huétor and la Alfaguara Natural Park (official name: Sierra de Huétor); Other names: n/a	37.2776°N 3.4692°W	Looks like this Site of Community Interest has an image. Don't worry, you can take one of your own, and upload it too!
ES6140004	Sierra Nevada National Park (Spain) (official name: Sierra Nevada); Other names: n/a	37.0788°N 3.1158°W	Looks like this Site of Community Interest has an image. Don't worry, you can take one of your own, and upload it too!
ES6140005	Sierra de La Sagra (official name: Sierra de La Sagra); Other names: n/a	37.8684°N 2.5353°W	Looks like this Site of Community Interest has an image. Don't worry, you can take one of your own, and upload it too!
ES6140006	Sierra de Arana (official name: Sierra de Arana); Other names: n/a	37.3276°N 3.385°W	Looks like this Site of Community Interest has an image. Don't worry, you can take one of your own, and upload it too!
ES6140007	Sierras del Campanario y Las Cabras (official name: Sierras del Campanario y Las Cabras); Other names: n/a	37.3673°N 3.6604°W	This Site of Community Interest has no photo. Take one and upload it! Thanks!
ES6140008	Sierra de Loja (official name: Sierra de Loja); Other names: n/a	37.064°N 4.1508°W	This Site of Community Interest has no photo. Take one and upload it! Thanks!
ES6140009	Sierra Nevada Noroeste (official name: Sierra Nevada Noroeste); Other names: n/a	37.1789°N 3.3366°W	Looks like this Site of Community Interest has an image. Don't worry, you can take one of your own, and upload it too!
ES6140010	Sierra de Baza Norte (official name: Sierra de Baza Norte); Other names: n/a	37.4748°N 2.8186°W	Looks like this Site of Community Interest has an image. Don't worry, you can take one of your own, and upload it too!
ES6140011	Sierra de Castell de Ferro (official name: Sierra de Castell de Ferro); Other names: n/a	36.7218°N 3.4002°W	This Site of Community Interest has no photo. Take one and upload it! Thanks!
ES6140012	La Malahá (official name: La Malahá); Other names: n/a	37.1263°N 3.7299°W	Looks like this Site of Community Interest has an image. Don't worry, you can take one of your own, and upload it too!
ES6140013	Acantilados y Fondos Marinos Tesorillo-Salobreña (official name: Acantilados y Fondos Marinos Tesorillo-Salobreña); Other names: n/a	36.7333°N 3.6321°W	This Site of Community Interest has no photo. Take one and upload it! Thanks!
ES6140014	Acantilados y Fondos Marinos de Calahonda-Castell de Ferro (official name: Acantilados y Fondos Marinos de Calahonda-Castell de Ferro); Other names: n/a	36.7031°N 3.3827°W	Looks like this Site of Community Interest has an image. Don't worry, you can take one of your own, and upload it too!
ES6140015	Barrancos del Río de Aguas Blancas (official name: Barrancos del Río de Aguas Blancas); Other names: n/a	37.2308°N 3.4114°W	This Site of Community Interest has no photo. Take one and upload it! Thanks!
ES6140016	Acantilados y Fondos Marinos de La Punta de La Mona (official name: Acantilados y Fondos Marinos de La Punta de La Mona); Other names: n/a	36.7184°N 3.7298°W	Looks like this Site of Community Interest has an image. Don't worry, you can take one of your own, and upload it too!
ES6150001	Laguna del Portil (official name: Laguna del Portil); Other names: n/a	37.2233°N 7.0467°W	Looks like this Site of Community Interest has an image. Don't worry, you can take one of your own, and upload it too!
ES6150002	Enebrales de Punta Umbría (official name: Enebrales de Punta Umbría); Other names: n/a	37.1942°N 6.9955°W	Looks like this Site of Community Interest has an image. Don't worry, you can take one of your own, and upload it too!
ES6150003	Estero de Domingo Rubio (official name: Estero de Domingo Rubio); Other names: n/a	37.1975°N 6.9035°W	This Site of Community Interest has no photo. Take one and upload it! Thanks!
ES6150004	Lagunas de Palos y Las Madres (official name: Lagunas de Palos y Las Madres); Other names: n/a	37.1529°N 6.859°W	Looks like this Site of Community Interest has an image. Don't worry, you can take one of your own, and upload it too!
ES6150005	Marismas de Isla Cristina (official name: Marismas de Isla Cristina); Other names: n/a	37.1884°N 7.335°W	Looks like this Site of Community Interest has an image. Don't worry, you can take one of your own, and upload it too!
ES6150006	Marismas del Río Piedras y Flecha del Rompido (official name: Marismas del Río Piedras y Flecha del Rompido); Other names: n/a	37.2097°N 7.1384°W	Looks like this Site of Community Interest has an image. Don't worry, you can take one of your own, and upload it too!
ES6150007	Peñas de Aroche (official name: Peñas de Aroche); Other names: n/a	37.921°N 7.0769°W	This Site of Community Interest has no photo. Take one and upload it! Thanks!
ES6150009	Doñana Norte y Oeste (official name: Doñana Norte y Oeste); Other names: n/a	37.2106°N 6.5679°W	Looks like this Site of Community Interest has an image. Don't worry, you can take one of your own, and upload it too!
ES6150010	Andévalo Occidental (official name: Andévalo Occidental); Other names: n/a	37.5371°N 7.3872°W	This Site of Community Interest has no photo. Take one and upload it! Thanks!
ES6150012	Dehesa del Estero y Montes de Moguer (official name: Dehesa del Estero y Montes de Moguer); Other names: n/a	37.1584°N 6.8211°W	This Site of Community Interest has no photo. Take one and upload it! Thanks!
ES6150013	Dunas del Odiel (official name: Dunas del Odiel); Other names: n/a	37.1601°N 6.8832°W	This Site of Community Interest has no photo. Take one and upload it! Thanks!
ES6150014	Marismas y Riberas del Tinto (official name: Marismas y Riberas del Tinto); Other names: n/a	37.2772°N 6.8715°W	Looks like this Site of Community Interest has an image. Don't worry, you can take one of your own, and upload it too!
ES6150015	Isla de San Bruno (official name: Isla de San Bruno); Other names: n/a	37.1838°N 7.3919°W	This Site of Community Interest has no photo. Take one and upload it! Thanks!
ES6150016	Acebuchal de Alpízar (official name: Acebuchal de Alpízar); Other names: n/a	37.454676°N 6.444561°W	This Site of Community Interest has no photo. Take one and upload it! Thanks!
ES6150017	Marisma de Las Carboneras (official name: Marisma de Las Carboneras); Other names: n/a	37.2659°N 6.9984°W	This Site of Community Interest has no photo. Take one and upload it! Thanks!
ES6150018	Río Guadiana y Ribera de Chanza (official name: Río Guadiana y Ribera de Chanza); Other names: n/a	37.4047°N 7.4558°W	Looks like this Site of Community Interest has an image. Don't worry, you can take one of your own, and upload it too!
ES6150019	Bajo Guadalquivir (official name: Bajo Guadalquivir); Other names: n/a	37.0118°N 6.1609°W	Looks like this Site of Community Interest has an image. Don't worry, you can take one of your own, and upload it too!
ES6150020	Arroyo del Alamillo (official name: Arroyo del Alamillo); Other names: n/a	37.3282°N 7.3434°W	This Site of Community Interest has no photo. Take one and upload it! Thanks!
ES6150021	Corredor Ecológico del Río Tinto (official name: Corredor Ecológico del Río Tinto); Other names: n/a	37.3699°N 6.5817°W	Looks like this Site of Community Interest has an image. Don't worry, you can take one of your own, and upload it too!
ES6150022	Rivera de Chanza (official name: Rivera de Chanza); Other names: n/a	37.9555°N 7.2115°W	This Site of Community Interest has no photo. Take one and upload it! Thanks!
ES6150023	Dehesa de Torrecuadros y Arroyo de Pilas (official name: Dehesa de Torrecuadros y Arroyo de Pilas); Other names: n/a	37.3352°N 6.3646°W	This Site of Community Interest has no photo. Take one and upload it! Thanks!
ES6150024	El Jure (official name: El Jure); Other names: n/a	37.5626°N 7.0888°W	This Site of Community Interest has no photo. Take one and upload it! Thanks!
ES6150025	Mina Carpio (official name: Mina Carpio); Other names: n/a	37.8113°N 6.9813°W	This Site of Community Interest has no photo. Take one and upload it! Thanks!
ES6150026	Mina Sotiel Coronada (official name: Mina Sotiel Coronada); Other names: n/a	37.6015°N 6.853°W	Looks like this Site of Community Interest has an image. Don't worry, you can take one of your own, and upload it too!
ES6150027	Mina Oriente (official name: Mina Oriente); Other names: n/a	37.6226°N 6.6819°W	This Site of Community Interest has no photo. Take one and upload it! Thanks!
ES6150028	Estuario del Río Piedras (official name: Estuario del Río Piedras); Other names: n/a	37.2127°N 7.0987°W	This Site of Community Interest has no photo. Take one and upload it! Thanks!
ES6150029	Estuario del Río Tinto (official name: Estuario del Río Tinto); Other names: n/a	37.1544°N 6.8999°W	This Site of Community Interest has no photo. Take one and upload it! Thanks!
ES6160001	Laguna Honda (official name: Laguna Honda); Other names: n/a	37.5952°N 4.1407°W	This Site of Community Interest has no photo. Take one and upload it! Thanks!
ES6160002	Alto Guadalquivir (official name: Alto Guadalquivir); Other names: n/a	37.9342°N 3.2854°W	This Site of Community Interest has no photo. Take one and upload it! Thanks!
ES6160003	Cascada de Cimbarra (official name: Cascada de Cimbarra); Other names: n/a	38.3928°N 3.3606°W	Looks like this Site of Community Interest has an image. Don't worry, you can take one of your own, and upload it too!
ES6160004	Laguna Grande (official name: Laguna Grande); Other names: n/a	37.9326°N 3.5596°W	Looks like this Site of Community Interest has an image. Don't worry, you can take one of your own, and upload it too!
ES6160005	Despeñaperros (official name: Despeñaperros); Other names: n/a	38.347204°N 3.536397°W	Looks like this Site of Community Interest has an image. Don't worry, you can take one of your own, and upload it too!
ES6160006	Sierras de Andújar (official name: Sierras de Andújar); Other names: n/a	38.256361°N 4.033622°W	Looks like this Site of Community Interest has an image. Don't worry, you can take one of your own, and upload it too!
ES6160007	Sierra Mágina (official name: Sierra Mágina); Other names: n/a	37.736292°N 3.457496°W	Looks like this Site of Community Interest has an image. Don't worry, you can take one of your own, and upload it too!
ES6160008	Cuencas del Rumblar, Guadalén y Guadalmena (official name: Cuencas del Rumblar, Guadalén y Guadalmena); Other names: n/a	38.359°N 3.3104°W	Looks like this Site of Community Interest has an image. Don't worry, you can take one of your own, and upload it too!
ES6160009	Estribaciones de Sierra Mágina (official name: Estribaciones de Sierra Mágina); Other names: n/a	37.756702°N 3.610152°W	Looks like this Site of Community Interest has an image. Don't worry, you can take one of your own, and upload it too!
ES6160010	Tramo Inferior del Río Guadalimar y Alto Guadalquivir (official name: Tramo Inferior del Río Guadalimar y Alto Guadalquivir); Other names: n/a	37.952°N 3.611°W	Looks like this Site of Community Interest has an image. Don't worry, you can take one of your own, and upload it too!
ES6160011	Río Guadiana Menor - Tramo Inferior (official name: Río Guadiana Menor - Tramo Inferior); Other names: n/a	37.7917°N 3.1538°W	Looks like this Site of Community Interest has an image. Don't worry, you can take one of your own, and upload it too!
ES6160012	Río Jándula (official name: Río Jándula); Other names: n/a	38.0583°N 4.1082°W	Looks like this Site of Community Interest has an image. Don't worry, you can take one of your own, and upload it too!
ES6160013	Río Guadalquivir Tramo Superior (official name: Río Guadalquivir Tramo Superior); Other names: n/a	38.0665°N 3.0393°W	Looks like this Site of Community Interest has an image. Don't worry, you can take one of your own, and upload it too!
ES6160014	Guadalimar (official name: Río Guadalimar); Other names: n/a	38.153°N 3.1618°W	Looks like this Site of Community Interest has an image. Don't worry, you can take one of your own, and upload it too!
ES6160015	Río Guadiana Menor - Tramo Superior (official name: Río Guadiana Menor - Tramo Superior); Other names: n/a	37.5475°N 2.9856°W	Looks like this Site of Community Interest has an image. Don't worry, you can take one of your own, and upload it too!
ES6170001	Laguna de La Ratosa (official name: Laguna de La Ratosa); Other names: n/a	37.1993°N 4.7027°W	This Site of Community Interest has no photo. Take one and upload it! Thanks!
ES6170002	Acantilados de Maro-Cerro Gordo (official name: Acantilados de Maro-Cerro Gordo); Other names: n/a	36.7376°N 3.7973°W	Looks like this Site of Community Interest has an image. Don't worry, you can take one of your own, and upload it too!
ES6170003	Desfiladero de Los Gaitanes (official name: Desfiladero de Los Gaitanes); Other names: n/a	36.9279°N 4.7622°W	Looks like this Site of Community Interest has an image. Don't worry, you can take one of your own, and upload it too!
ES6170004	Los Reales de Sierra Bermeja (official name: Los Reales de Sierra Bermeja); Other names: n/a	36.493°N 5.2019°W	Looks like this Site of Community Interest has an image. Don't worry, you can take one of your own, and upload it too!
ES6170005	Sierra Crestellina (official name: Sierra Crestellina); Other names: n/a	36.4652°N 5.2803°W	Looks like this Site of Community Interest has an image. Don't worry, you can take one of your own, and upload it too!
ES6170006	Parque natural de la Sierra de las Nieves (official name: Sierra de Las Nieves); Other names: n/a	36.6886°N 4.9973°W	Looks like this Site of Community Interest has an image. Don't worry, you can take one of your own, and upload it too!
ES6170007	Sierras de Tejeda, Almijara y Alhama (official name: Sierras de Tejeda, Almijara y Alhama); Other names: n/a	36.8036°N 3.9121°W	Looks like this Site of Community Interest has an image. Don't worry, you can take one of your own, and upload it too!
ES6170008	Sierras de Abdalajís y La Encantada Sur (official name: Sierras de Abdalajís y La Encantada Sur); Other names: n/a	36.9409°N 4.7454°W	Looks like this Site of Community Interest has an image. Don't worry, you can take one of your own, and upload it too!
ES6170009	Sierras de Alcaparaín y Aguas (official name: Sierras de Alcaparaín y Aguas); Other names: n/a	36.8272°N 4.805°W	Looks like this Site of Community Interest has an image. Don't worry, you can take one of your own, and upload it too!
ES6170010	Sierras Bermeja y Real (official name: Sierras Bermeja y Real); Other names: n/a	36.5435°N 5.1124°W	Looks like this Site of Community Interest has an image. Don't worry, you can take one of your own, and upload it too!
ES6170011	Sierra Blanca (official name: Sierra Blanca); Other names: n/a	36.5675°N 4.9007°W	Looks like this Site of Community Interest has an image. Don't worry, you can take one of your own, and upload it too!
ES6170012	Sierra de Camarolos (official name: Sierra de Camarolos); Other names: n/a	36.9616°N 4.3829°W	Looks like this Site of Community Interest has an image. Don't worry, you can take one of your own, and upload it too!
ES6170013	Sierra de Mollina (official name: Sierra de Mollina); Other names: n/a	37.1676°N 4.6639°W	This Site of Community Interest has no photo. Take one and upload it! Thanks!
ES6170015	Lagunas de Campillos (official name: Lagunas de Campillos); Other names: n/a	37.0381°N 4.8281°W	This Site of Community Interest has no photo. Take one and upload it! Thanks!
ES6170016	Valle del Río del Genal (official name: Valle del Río del Genal); Other names: n/a	36.5888°N 5.222°W	Looks like this Site of Community Interest has an image. Don't worry, you can take one of your own, and upload it too!
ES6170017	Río de Castor (official name: Río de Castor); Other names: n/a	36.4706°N 5.1153°W	Looks like this Site of Community Interest has an image. Don't worry, you can take one of your own, and upload it too!
ES6170018	Cueva de Belda I (official name: Cueva de Belda I); Other names: n/a	37.2561°N 4.4033°W	This Site of Community Interest has no photo. Take one and upload it! Thanks!
ES6170019	Río Verde (official name: Río Verde); Other names: n/a	36.5298°N 4.9577°W	Looks like this Site of Community Interest has an image. Don't worry, you can take one of your own, and upload it too!
ES6170020	Río Guadaiza (official name: Río Guadaiza); Other names: n/a	36.5041°N 4.9858°W	Looks like this Site of Community Interest has an image. Don't worry, you can take one of your own, and upload it too!
ES6170021	Guadalmina (official name: Río Guadalmina); Other names: n/a	36.4983°N 5.0201°W	Looks like this Site of Community Interest has an image. Don't worry, you can take one of your own, and upload it too!
ES6170022	Río Fuengirola (official name: Río Fuengirola); Other names: n/a	36.5443°N 4.7107°W	Looks like this Site of Community Interest has an image. Don't worry, you can take one of your own, and upload it too!
ES6170023	Yeso III, Higuerones IX y El Marrubio (official name: Yeso III, Higuerones IX y El Marrubio); Other names: n/a	36.9801°N 4.7225°W	This Site of Community Interest has no photo. Take one and upload it! Thanks!
ES6170024	Río Guadalmansa (official name: Río Guadalmansa); Other names: n/a	36.489°N 5.072°W	This Site of Community Interest has no photo. Take one and upload it! Thanks!
ES6170025	Río Real (official name: Río Real); Other names: n/a	36.5196°N 4.8476°W	This Site of Community Interest has no photo. Take one and upload it! Thanks!
ES6170026	Río del Padrón (official name: Río del Padrón); Other names: n/a	36.4502°N 5.1258°W	Looks like this Site of Community Interest has an image. Don't worry, you can take one of your own, and upload it too!
ES6170027	Arroyo de La Cala (official name: Arroyo de La Cala); Other names: n/a	36.4604°N 5.1495°W	This Site of Community Interest has no photo. Take one and upload it! Thanks!
ES6170028	Guadalmedina (official name: Río Guadalmedina); Other names: n/a	36.8066°N 4.4371°W	Looks like this Site of Community Interest has an image. Don't worry, you can take one of your own, and upload it too!
ES6170029	Río Manilva (official name: Río Manilva); Other names: n/a	36.3856°N 5.2506°W	Looks like this Site of Community Interest has an image. Don't worry, you can take one of your own, and upload it too!
ES6170030	Calahonda (Mijas) (official name: Calahonda); Other names: n/a	36.4948°N 4.6802°W	Looks like this Site of Community Interest has an image. Don't worry, you can take one of your own, and upload it too!
ES6170031	Guadiaro (river) (official name: Río Guadiaro); Other names: n/a	36.6309°N 5.3106°W	Looks like this Site of Community Interest has an image. Don't worry, you can take one of your own, and upload it too!
ES6170032	Sierra Blanquilla (official name: Sierra Blanquilla); Other names: n/a	36.7872°N 5.0016°W	Looks like this Site of Community Interest has an image. Don't worry, you can take one of your own, and upload it too!
ES6170033	Ríos Guadalhorce, Fahalas y Pereilas (official name: Ríos Guadalhorce, Fahalas y Pereilas); Other names: n/a	36.6879°N 4.6834°W	Looks like this Site of Community Interest has an image. Don't worry, you can take one of your own, and upload it too!
ES6170034	Río Guadalevín (official name: Río Guadalevín); Other names: n/a	36.7393°N 5.1623°W	Looks like this Site of Community Interest has an image. Don't worry, you can take one of your own, and upload it too!
ES6170038	Montes de Málaga Natural Park (official name: Montes de Málaga); Other names: n/a	36.825°N 4.3885°W	Looks like this Site of Community Interest has an image. Don't worry, you can take one of your own, and upload it too!
ES6180001	Complejo endorreico de Utrera (official name: Complejo endorreico de Utrera); Other names: n/a	37.0423°N 5.8154°W	This Site of Community Interest has no photo. Take one and upload it! Thanks!
ES6180002	Complejo endorreico La Lantejuela (official name: Complejo endorreico La Lantejuela); Other names: n/a	37.3617°N 5.1809°W	This Site of Community Interest has no photo. Take one and upload it! Thanks!
ES6180003	Laguna del Gosque (official name: Laguna del Gosque); Other names: n/a	37.1324°N 4.9459°W	This Site of Community Interest has no photo. Take one and upload it! Thanks!
ES6180004	Sierra de Alanís (official name: Sierra de Alanís); Other names: n/a	38.1062°N 5.6137°W	This Site of Community Interest has no photo. Take one and upload it! Thanks!
ES6180005	Corredor Ecológico del Río Guadiamar (official name: Corredor Ecológico del Río Guadiamar); Other names: n/a	37.5762°N 6.3412°W	Looks like this Site of Community Interest has an image. Don't worry, you can take one of your own, and upload it too!
ES6180006	Laguna de Coripe (official name: Laguna de Coripe); Other names: n/a	37.0089°N 5.3601°W	This Site of Community Interest has no photo. Take one and upload it! Thanks!
ES6180007	Arroyo de Santiago, Salado de Morón y Matabueyes/Garrapata (official name: Arroyo de Santiago, Salado de Morón y Matabueyes/Garrapata); Other names: n/a	36.9441°N 5.5776°W	This Site of Community Interest has no photo. Take one and upload it! Thanks!
ES6180009	Río del Viar (official name: Río del Viar); Other names: n/a	37.7154°N 5.8808°W	This Site of Community Interest has no photo. Take one and upload it! Thanks!
ES6180010	Rivera de Cala (official name: Rivera de Cala); Other names: n/a	37.7761°N 6.1343°W	This Site of Community Interest has no photo. Take one and upload it! Thanks!
ES6180011	Río Corbones (official name: Río Corbones); Other names: n/a	37.1236°N 5.2251°W	Looks like this Site of Community Interest has an image. Don't worry, you can take one of your own, and upload it too!
ES6180012	Minas El Galayo y La Jabata (official name: Minas El Galayo y La Jabata); Other names: n/a	37.7886°N 5.4279°W	This Site of Community Interest has no photo. Take one and upload it! Thanks!
ES6180013	Río Guadaira (official name: Río Guadaira); Other names: n/a	37.111°N 5.5288°W	Looks like this Site of Community Interest has an image. Don't worry, you can take one of your own, and upload it too!
ES6180014	Salado de Lebrija-Las Cabezas (official name: Salado de Lebrija-Las Cabezas); Other names: n/a	36.8931°N 5.882999999999999°W	This Site of Community Interest has no photo. Take one and upload it! Thanks!
ES6180015	Mina El Abrevadero (official name: Mina El Abrevadero); Other names: n/a	37.7054°N 5.7632°W	This Site of Community Interest has no photo. Take one and upload it! Thanks!
ES6180016	Venta de Las Navas (official name: Venta de Las Navas); Other names: n/a	37.8361°N 5.5268°W	This Site of Community Interest has no photo. Take one and upload it! Thanks!

== See also ==
- List of Sites of Community Importance in Spain
