= Dolmen de Viera =

Megalithic tomb in Andalusia, Spain

Coordinates: 37.024116°N 04.548374°W

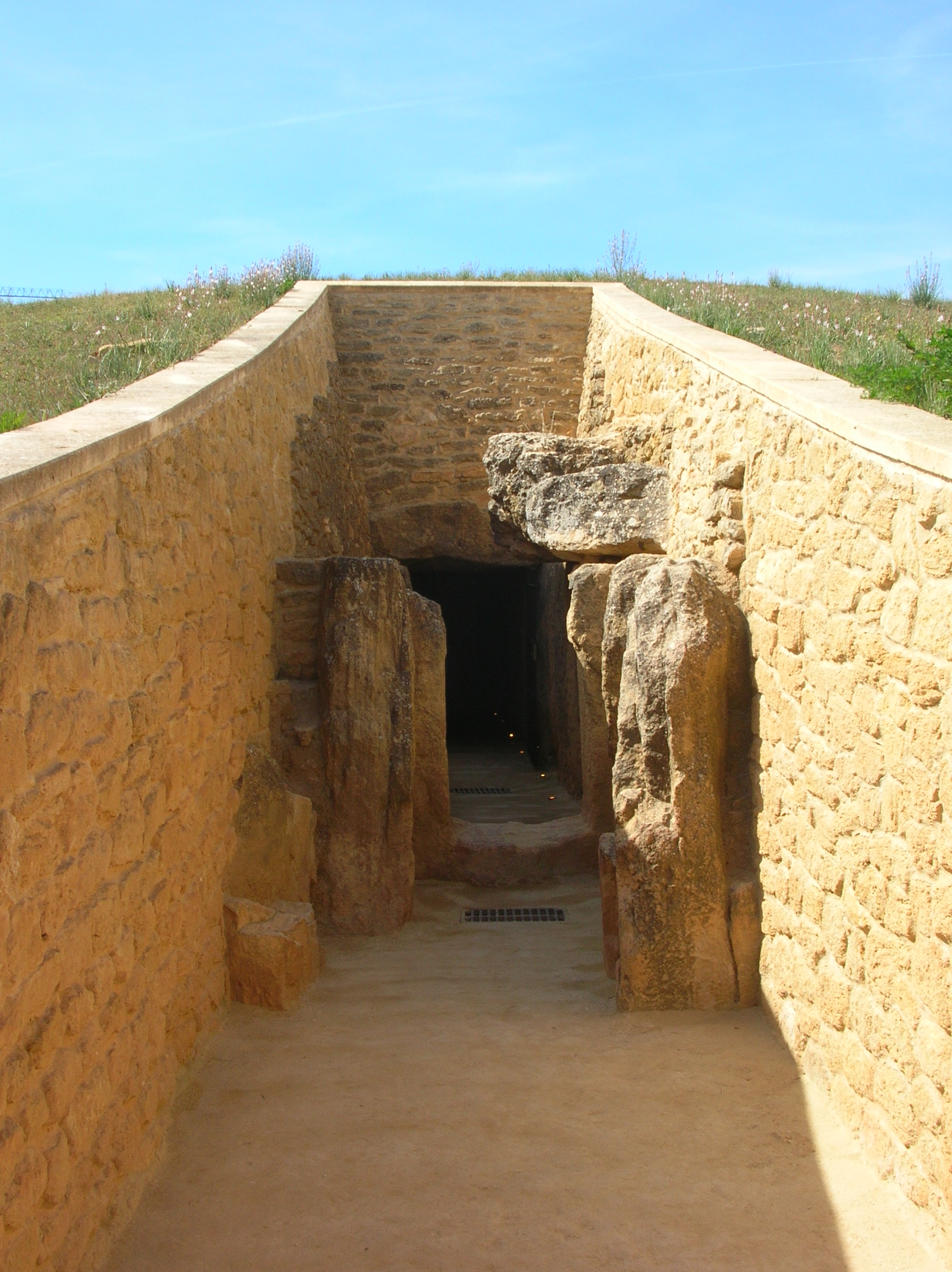
- Entrance to the Dolmen de Viera
- Interactive map of Dolmen de Viera
- Type: Tumulus
- Location: Antequera, Andalusia, Spain

History
- Built: c. 3250 BC

Site notes
- Material: Stone
- Length: 21 m (69 ft)
- Discovered: February 1903 by Antonio and Jose Fuentes
- Owner: Council of Culture, Andalusian Autonomous Government
- Public access: yes

UNESCO World Heritage Site
- Official name: Antequera Dolmens Site
- Type: Cultural
- Criteria: i, iii, iv
- Designated: 2016 (40th session)
- Reference no.: 1501
- Region: Europe and North America

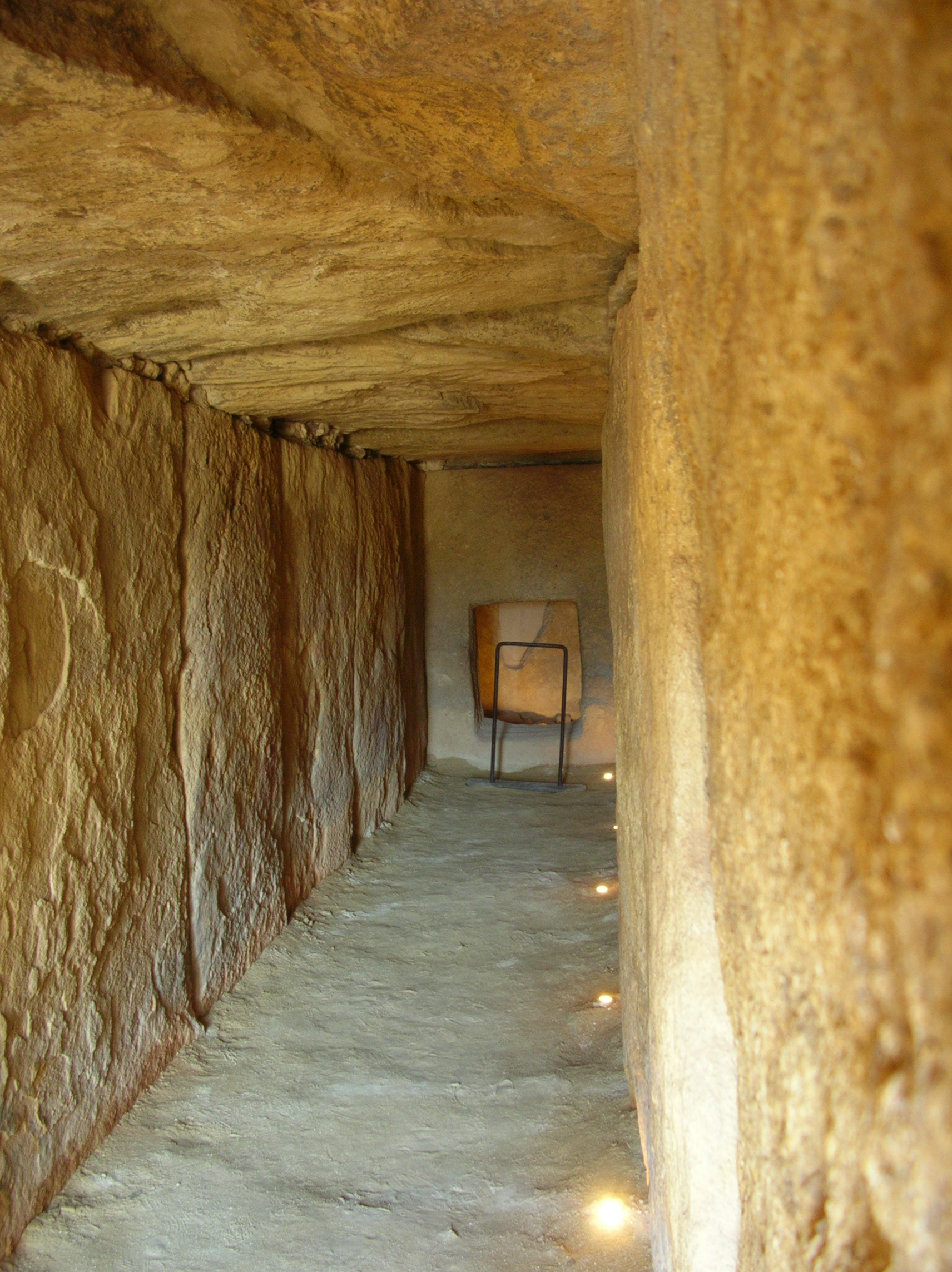
Interior of the chamber

The Dolmen de Viera or Dolmen de los Hermanos Viera is a dolmen—a type of single-chamber megalithic tomb—located in Antequera, province of Málaga, Andalusia, Spain. It is located only 70 metres (230 ft) from the Dolmen of Menga and about 4 kilometres (2.5 mi) from Tholos de El Romeral. It was discovered in February 1903 by brothers Antonio and Jose Fuentes from Antequera, who also discovered El Romeral.

== Description ==
Like the Dolmen de Menga, it is built with an orthostatic technique: large stones standing upright. It consists of a long corridor formed by 27 stones, leading to a rectangular chamber. This is presumed to be a burial chamber, although only silica and bone tools and ceramics were discovered there. The burial chamber has different dimensions than the corridor: a little over 2 metres (79 in) high and 1.8 metres (71 in) wide, while the corridor is 1.85 metres (73 in) high and ranges from 1.3 metres (51 in) wide at the entrance to 1.6 metres (63 in) where it meets up with the chamber. The corridor is a bit over 21 metres (69 ft) long. The stones range from 20 centimetres (7.9 in) to 50 centimetres (20 in) in thickness.

The dolmen is covered by a mound or tumulus 50 metres (160 ft) in diameter. Like most Iberian tombs, it is oriented slightly south of east (96°), situated precisely so that at the summer solstices the sunlight at daybreak illuminates the burial chamber.

The left and right sides of the corridor appear to have consisted originally of sixteen slabs each; fourteen remain on the left and 15 on the right. Five larger slabs are intact in the roof, and there are fragments of two others; it would appear that three or four more have been entirely lost. The end of the corridor is a single large monolith with a square hole near its center. This and three other monoliths surround the chamber There is a notable difference between the stones on the sides and those of the roof: the former is much more carefully worked and fit perfectly into the recesses made in the stones of the entrance and the floor.

== History ==
The Dolmen de Viera was built in the Copper Age, 3510-3020 BC approx. It has had the status of a National monument since 1923.

== Current status ==
The site is owned by the Council of Culture of the Andalusian Autonomous Government, who manage it as part of the Conjunto Arqueológico Dólmenes de Antequera. The dolmen was restored recently, and is open for visits by the public.

In 2016, the dolmens of Menga, Viera, and El Romeral were all inscribed as a UNESCO World Heritage Site under the name Antequera Dolmens Site.

== Gallery ==
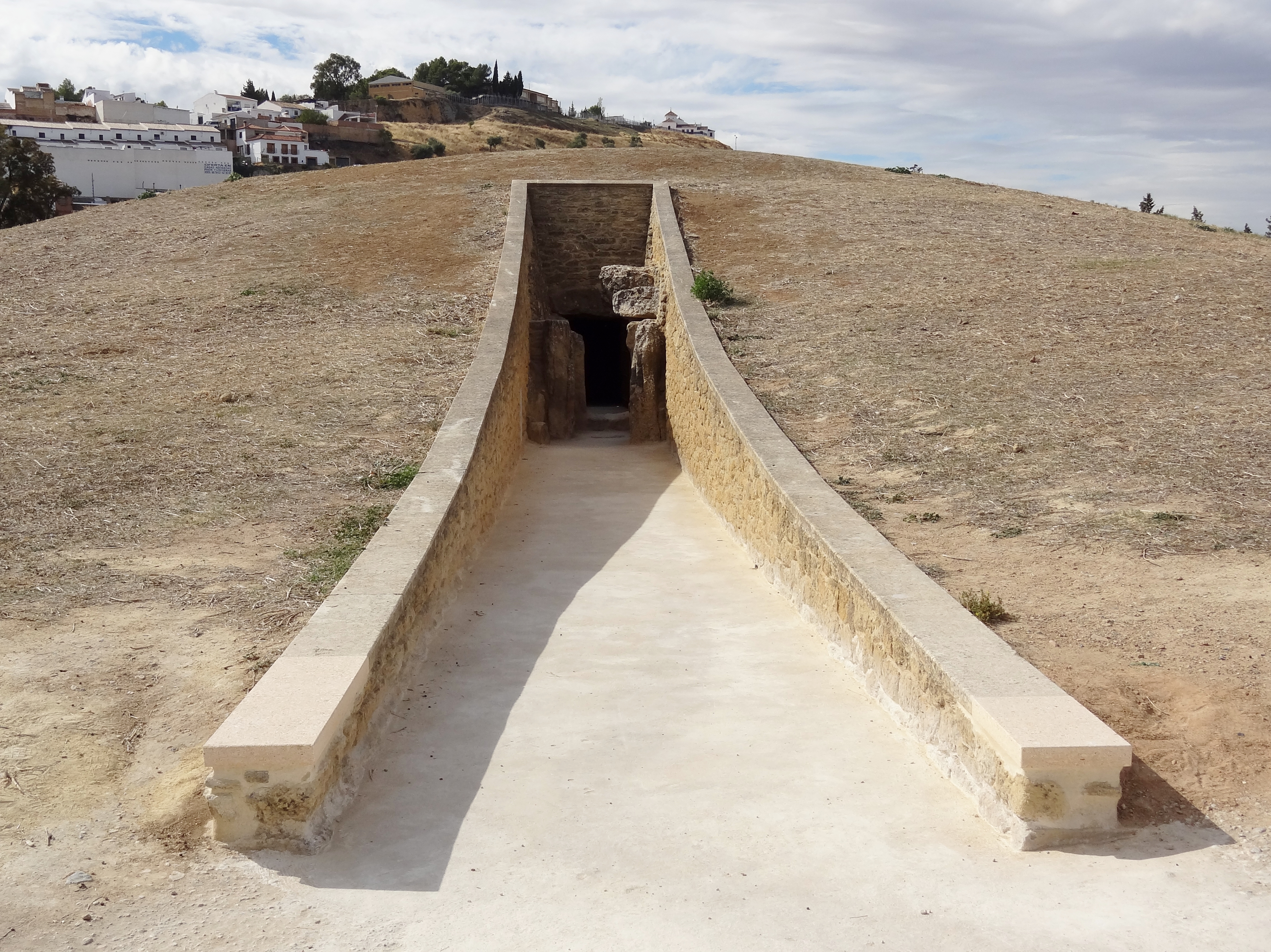

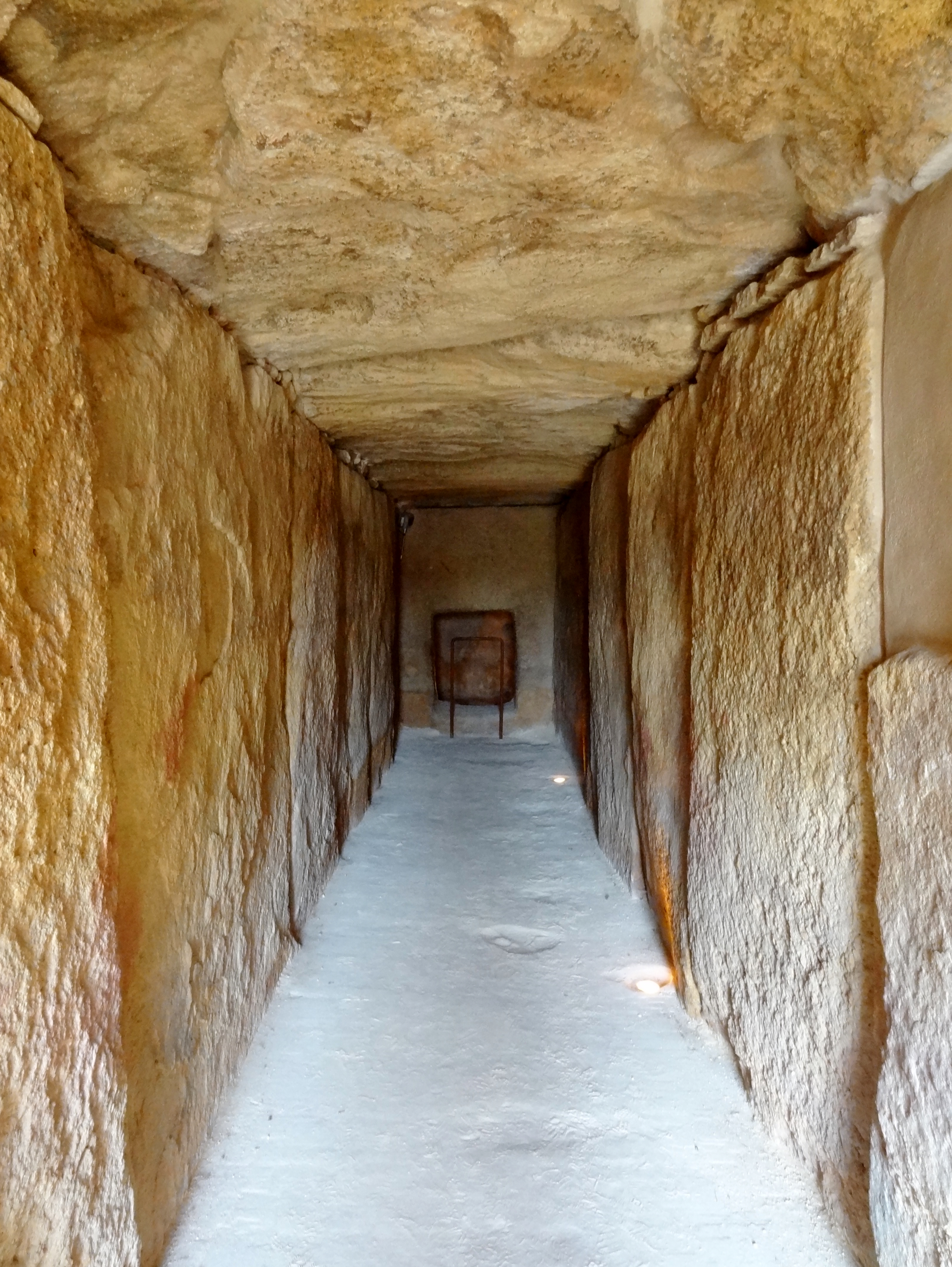

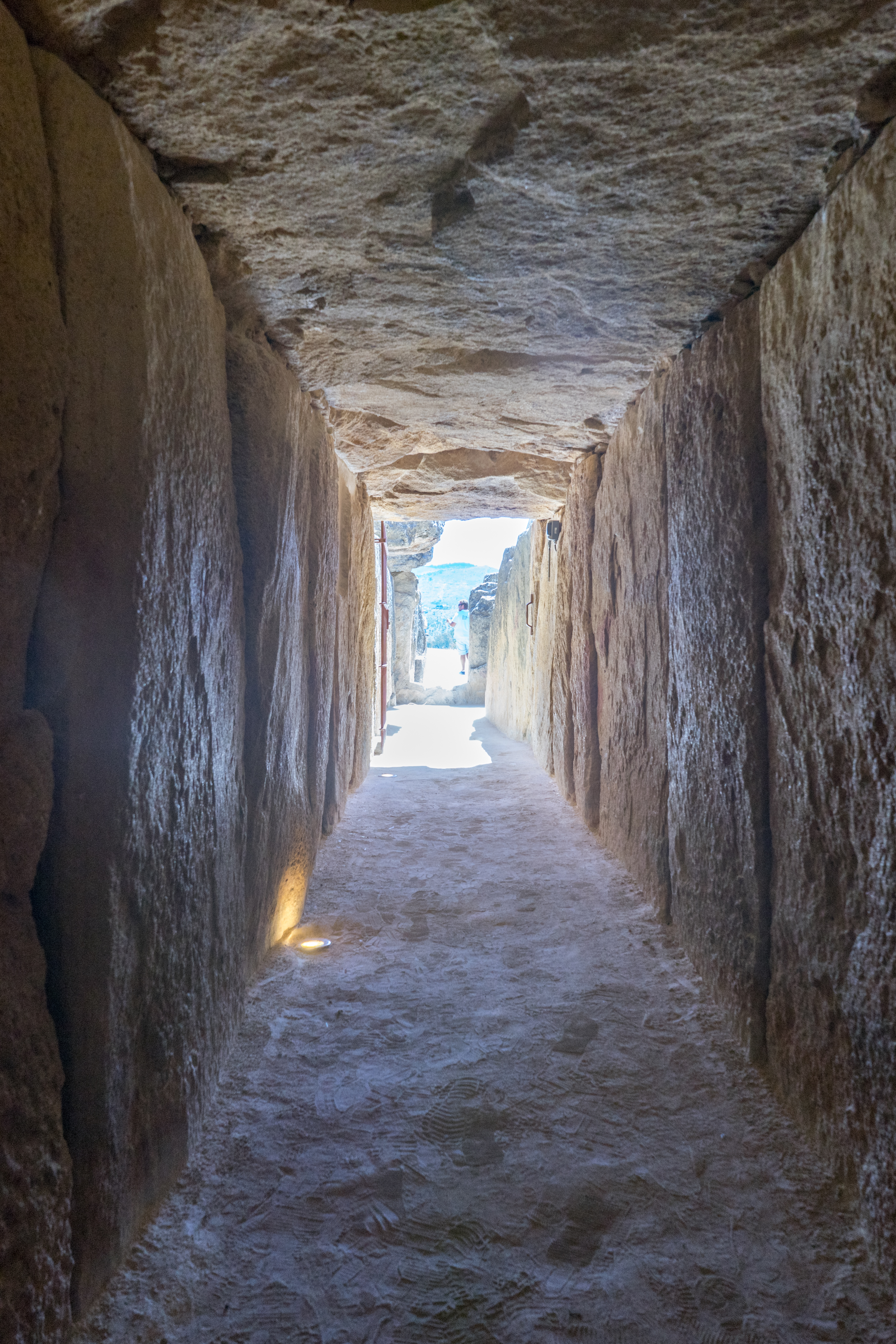

== See also ==
- Antequera Dolmens Site
- Dolmen of Menga
- Dolmen de Soto
- Tholos de El Romeral
