= Peña de los Enamorados =

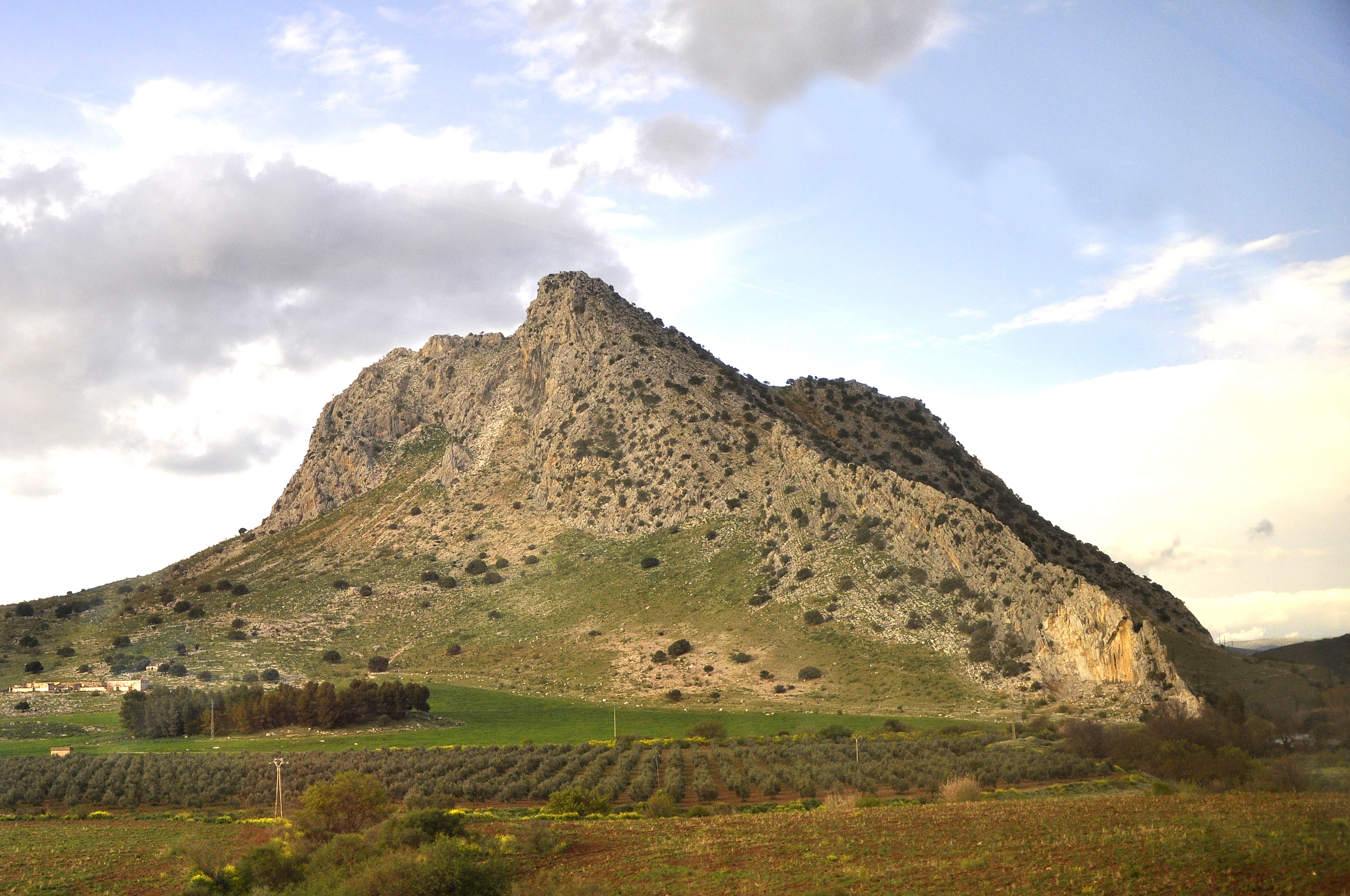
- Peña de los Enamorados seen from the railway line between Seville and Granada
- Interactive map of Peña de los Enamorados
- 37°4′4″N 4°29′24″W

UNESCO World Heritage Site
- Official name: Antequera Dolmens Site
- Type: Cultural
- Criteria: i, iii, iv
- Designated: 2016 (40th session)
- Reference no.: 1501-002
- Region: Europe and North America

Peña de los Enamorados
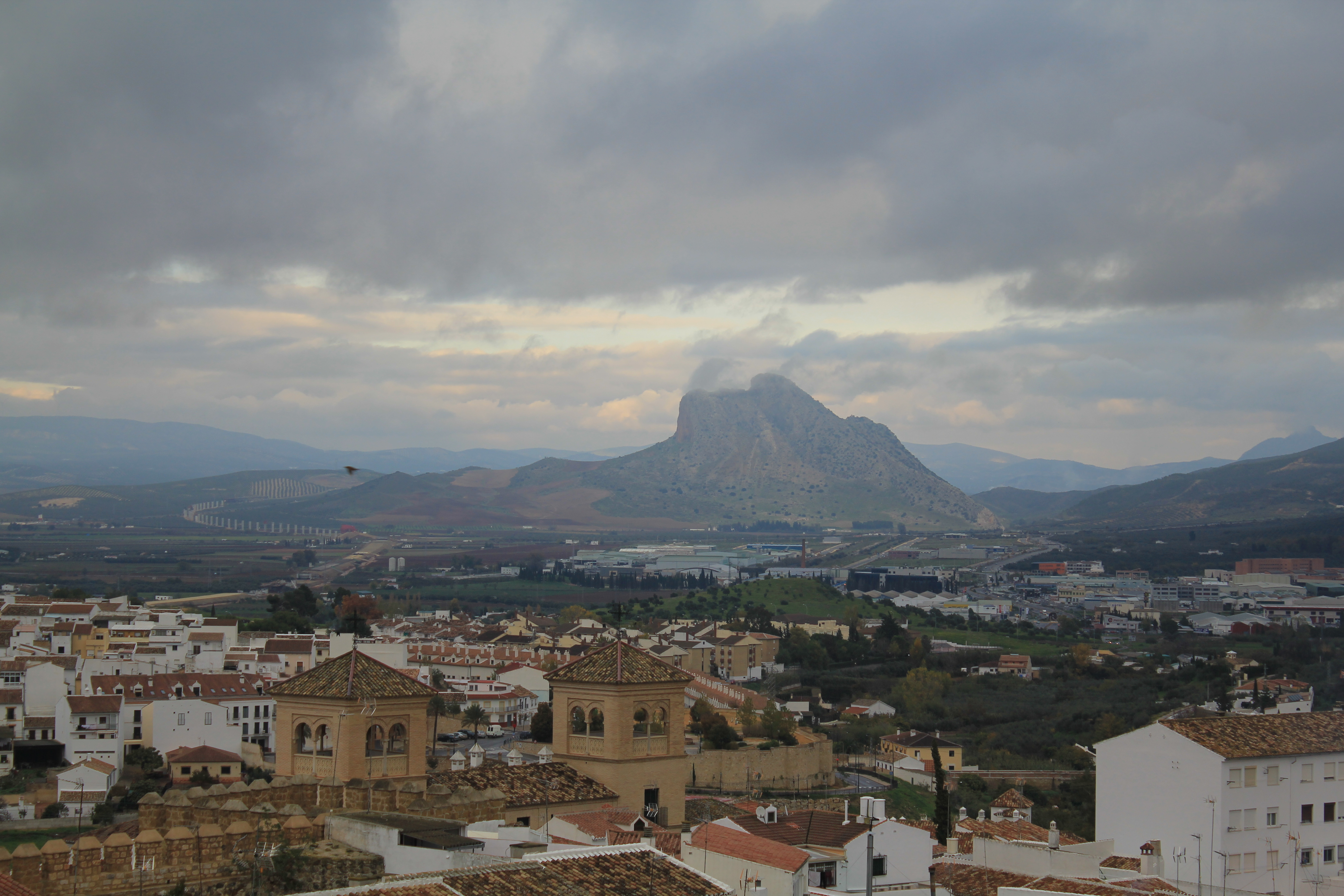
- "Sleeping giant"

Highest point
- Elevation: 880 m (2,890 ft)
- Coordinates: 37°4′4″N 4°29′24″W

Geography
- Location within Spain
- Location: Málaga Province, Andalusia
- Parent range: Penibaetic System

Geology
- Mountain type: Limestone

Climbing
- Easiest route: From Antequera

Peña de los Enamorados ("The Lovers' Rock") is a mountain near the city of Antequera, Málaga Province, Andalusia, Spain. It reaches a height of 880 metres above sea level.

== Name ==
The mountain was named after a legend from the local oral tradition. The most well-known version of the legend says that two young Moorish lovers from rival clans, a young man from Antequera and girl from nearby Archidona, threw themselves from the rock while being pursued by the girl's father and his men. This romantic legend was later adapted by Robert Southey. In his Laila and Manuel, the lovers were a Muslim girl and her father's Christian slave.

Christopher Columbus knew of this name. His chronicler, Bartolome de Casas, copied a log entry from Oct 29, 1492 in which Columbus describes what he saw 8 days earlier in Cuba, "Remarking on the position of the river and port, to which he gave the name San Salvador, he described its mountains as lofty and beautiful, like the peña de las enamoradas ... ". (Note that there is a mistaken choice of gender in the name by someone, be it Columbus himself, the chronicler or the translator.)

The mountain is also popularly known as "Montaña del Indio" because it looks like the head of an American Indian when seen from certain angles.

=== Abrigo de Matacabras ===
The Abrigo (shelter) of Matacabras, located at the foot of the northwest face of the Peña de los Enamorados, is closely linked with the Dolmen of Menga, whose central axis points directly to it. The tomb is oriented to the northeast, north of the sunrise on the summer solstice. It is the only known tomb so oriented in Europe in this cultural context.

The ATLAS research group from the University of Seville in 2018 published a study of the high resolution analysis of Abrigo de Matacabras's schematic style cave paintings. The small cave has both visual and symbolic links to the Menga dolmen, establishing landscape relationships that are possibly unique in European prehistory. The results confirmed the Neolithic chronology of the cave “probably, at least, at the beginning of the 4th millennium BC... and its importance as a place of reference for the Neolithic (and possibly even older) population of the region...”
