= Valencina de la Concepción =

Valencina de la Concepción, Spain
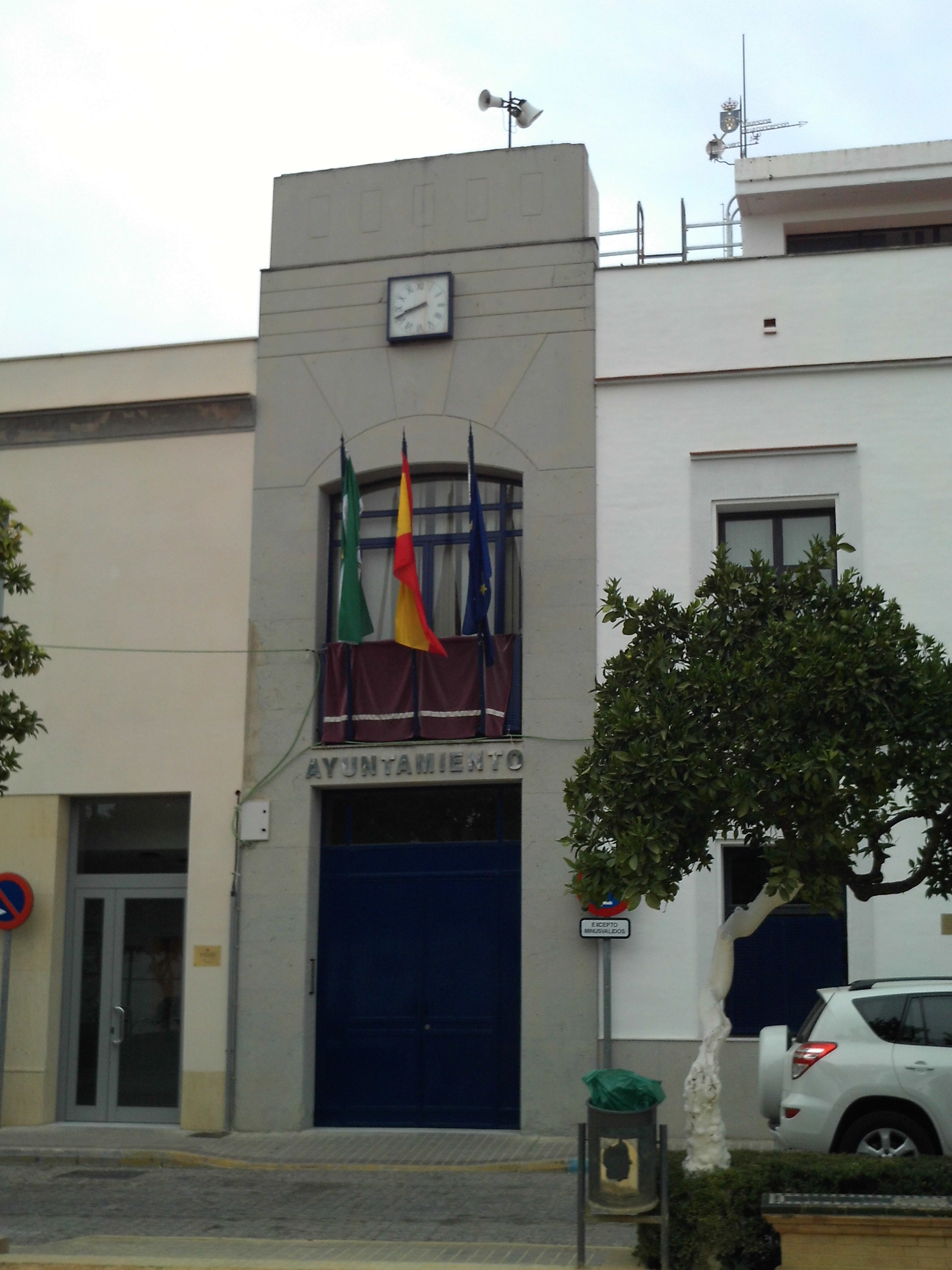
- Valencina de la Concepción town hall

- Flag Coat of arms
- Interactive map of Valencina de la Concepción, Spain
- Coordinates: 37°24′58″N 6°4′36″W
- Country: Spain
- Province: Seville
- Municipality: Valencina de la Concepción

Area
  - Total: 25 km^{2} (9.7 sq mi)

Population (2025-01-01)
  - Total: 8,050
  - Density: 320/km^{2} (830/sq mi)
- Time zone: UTC+1 (CET)
  - Summer (DST): UTC+2 (CEST)
- Website: valencinadelaconcepcion.es

Valencina de la Concepción is a town located in the province of Seville, Andalusia, Spain. It has a population of 7,800 as of 2018. It is the site of significant archaeological finds.

== Romería de Torrijos festival ==
On the second Sunday of October there is a public holiday in the town, called "Romería de Torrijos". In 1923, the decision was taken to establish a pilgrimage to the sanctuary of Torrijos on the second Sunday of October, carrying in procession the image of the patroness. The Virgin is accompanied by numerous pilgrims in decorated carriages or on horseback. When the Virgin arrives at the Torrijos Hacienda, mass is celebrated in the central courtyard. It is a major pilgrimage of the Aljarafe comarca.

== Prehistory ==
The town has a large Chalcolithic deposit, one of the largest of Spain. In Valencina there are two very famous dolmens, the dolmen of Matarrubilla and the Dolmen de la Pastora. A dolmen is a megalithic tomb with several upright stones supporting a flat table or capstone. Many date back to pre 3000 BC. Originally the dolmens were covered with earth to form a barrow, but time has eroded the soil leaving just the stones over the graves intact.

Two tombs in the area have contributed to a significant find in archaeological research. An elaborate tomb with rich artifacts (the Tholos de Montelirio) determined to be that of the cultural leader who, evidence indicates was venerated for decades after burial and another tomb that was not so elaborate, but also with artifacts that indicate high social status as a leader, had been excavated in Valencina and studied extensively. In 2023, a dental enamel analysis technique that enables precise gender identification facilitated reinterpretation of the finds. The new scientific analysis revealed that both tombs belonged to women and this evidence has led to a complete reassessment of the culture and perhaps, to many finds where accurate gender identification had not been possible previously and had led to presumptions about the cultures now being shown as incorrect.

The subject of the elaborate tomb is being discussed in scientific literature as "the Ivory Lady" and she is considered as the most socially prominent person identified during archaeological research of the Copper Age cultures of the Iberian peninsula that are dated to 3200 to 2500 BC, approximately the time Ancient Egyptian and Mesopotamian cultures were emerging and flourishing.

Other large tholoi with long entrance passages are the Dolmen de la Pastora and the Dolmen de Matarrubilla.

Archaeological remains from 2500 BC indicate it was a major copper-smelting town.

=== Gallery ===
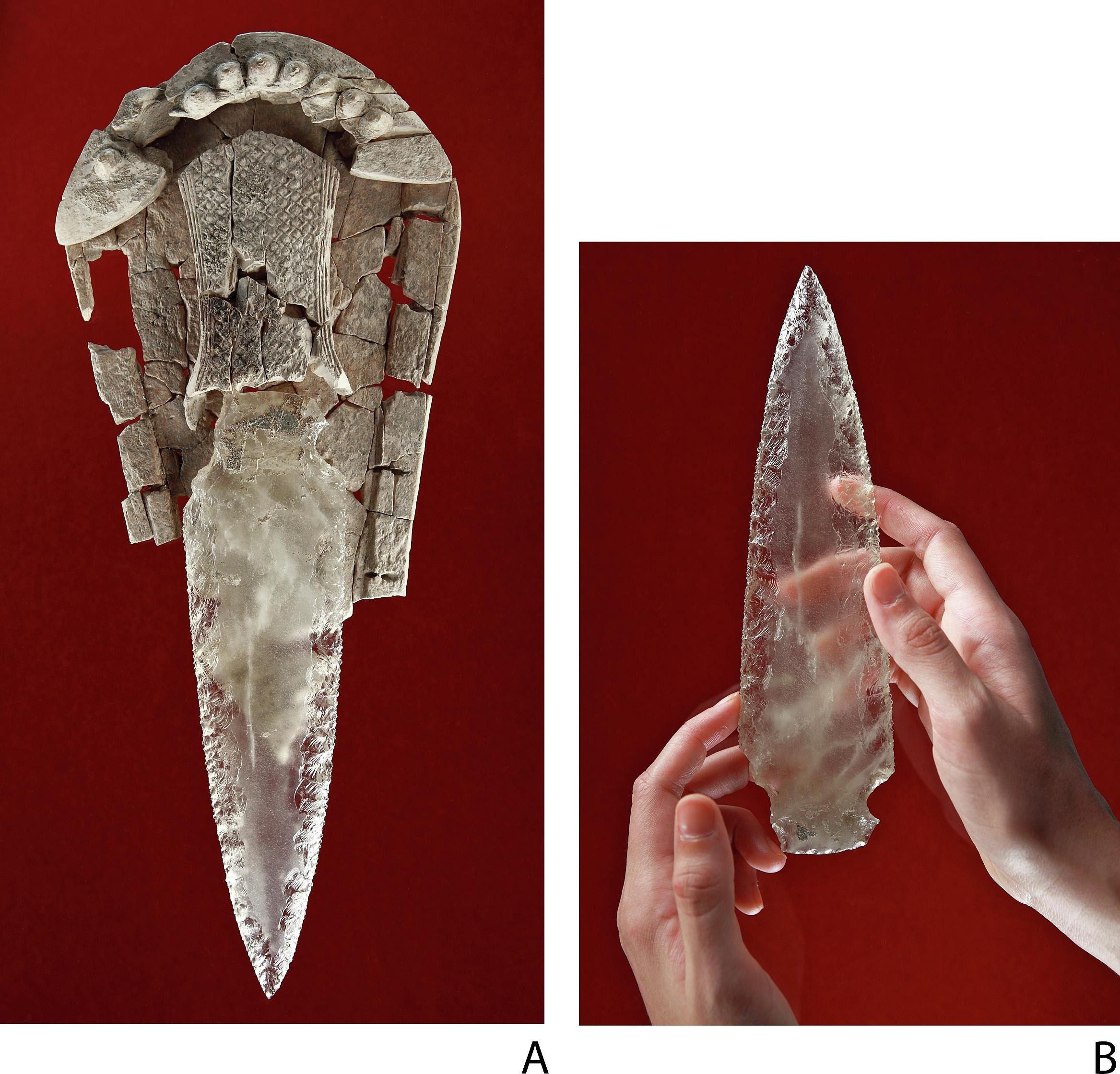
Crystal dagger, 3000-2500 BC

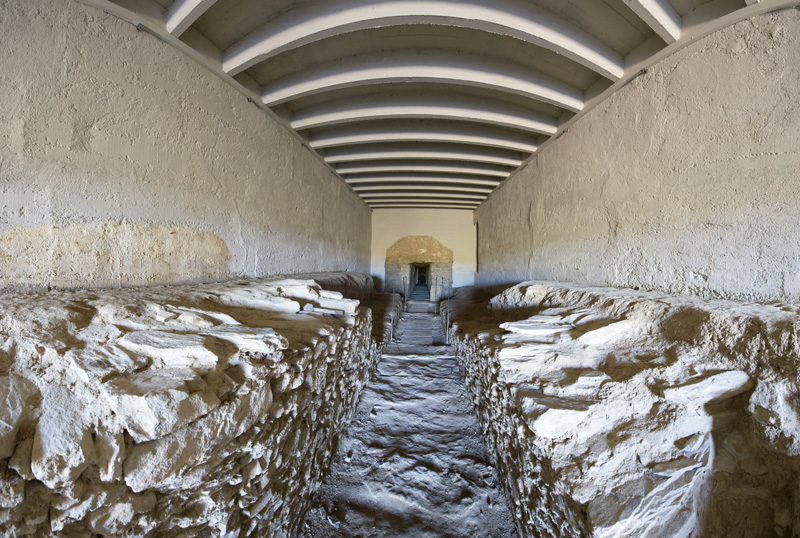
Dolmen de la Pastora entrance

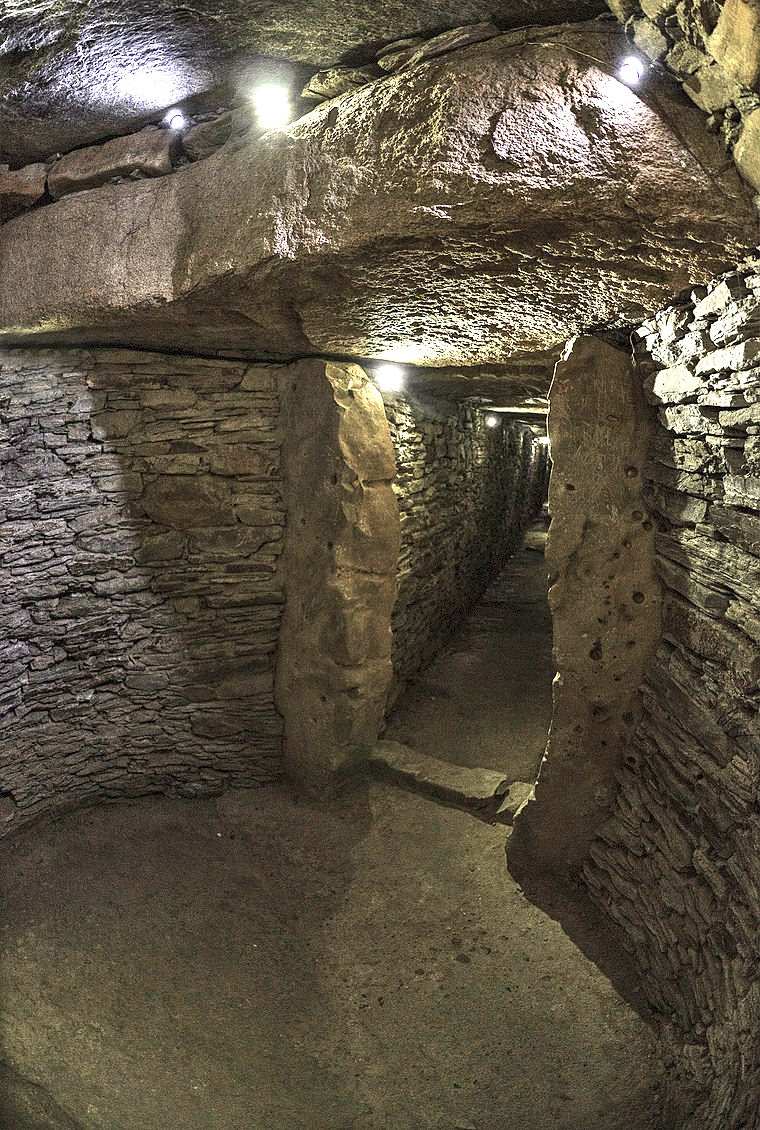
Dolmen de la Pastora interior

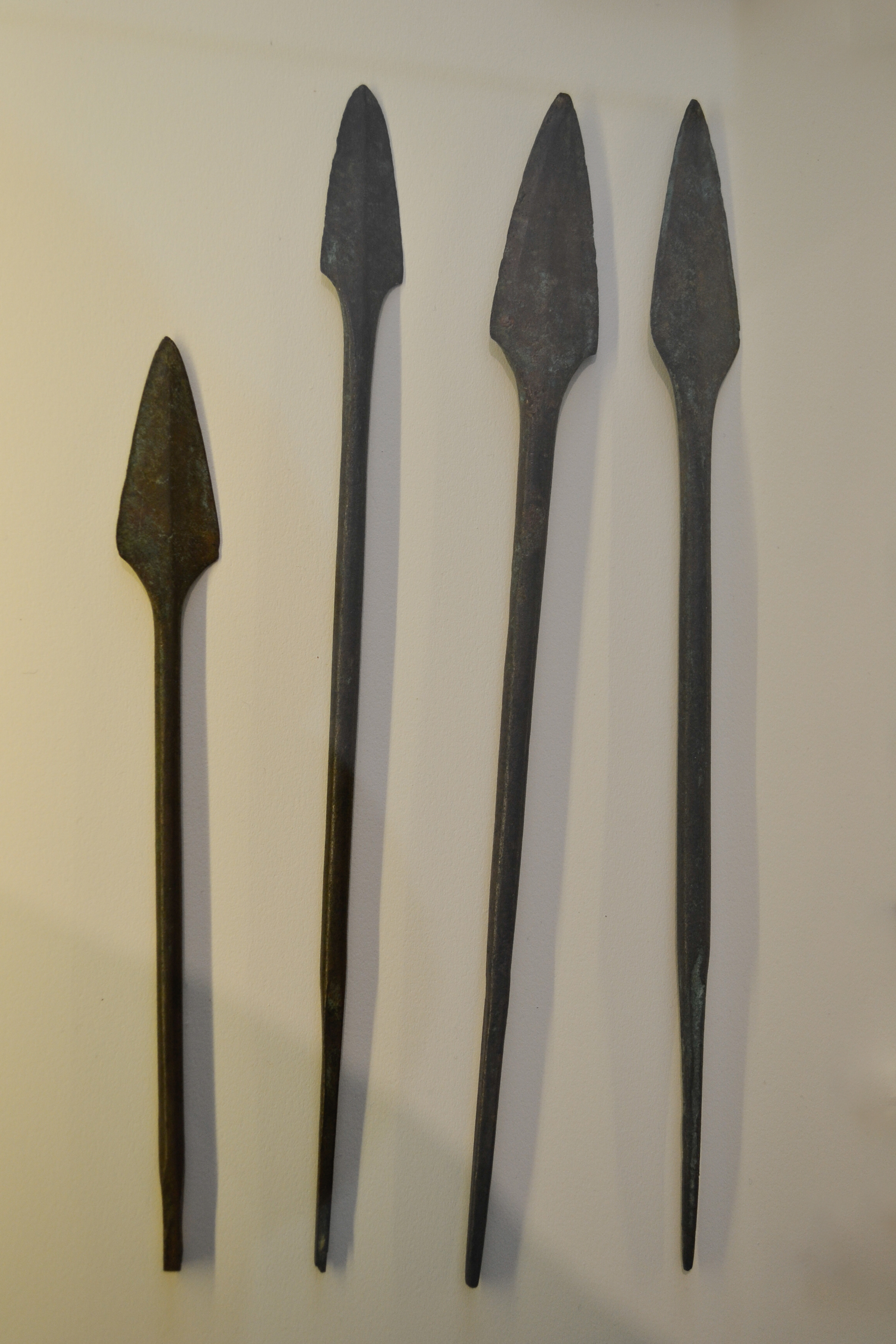
Copper javelins

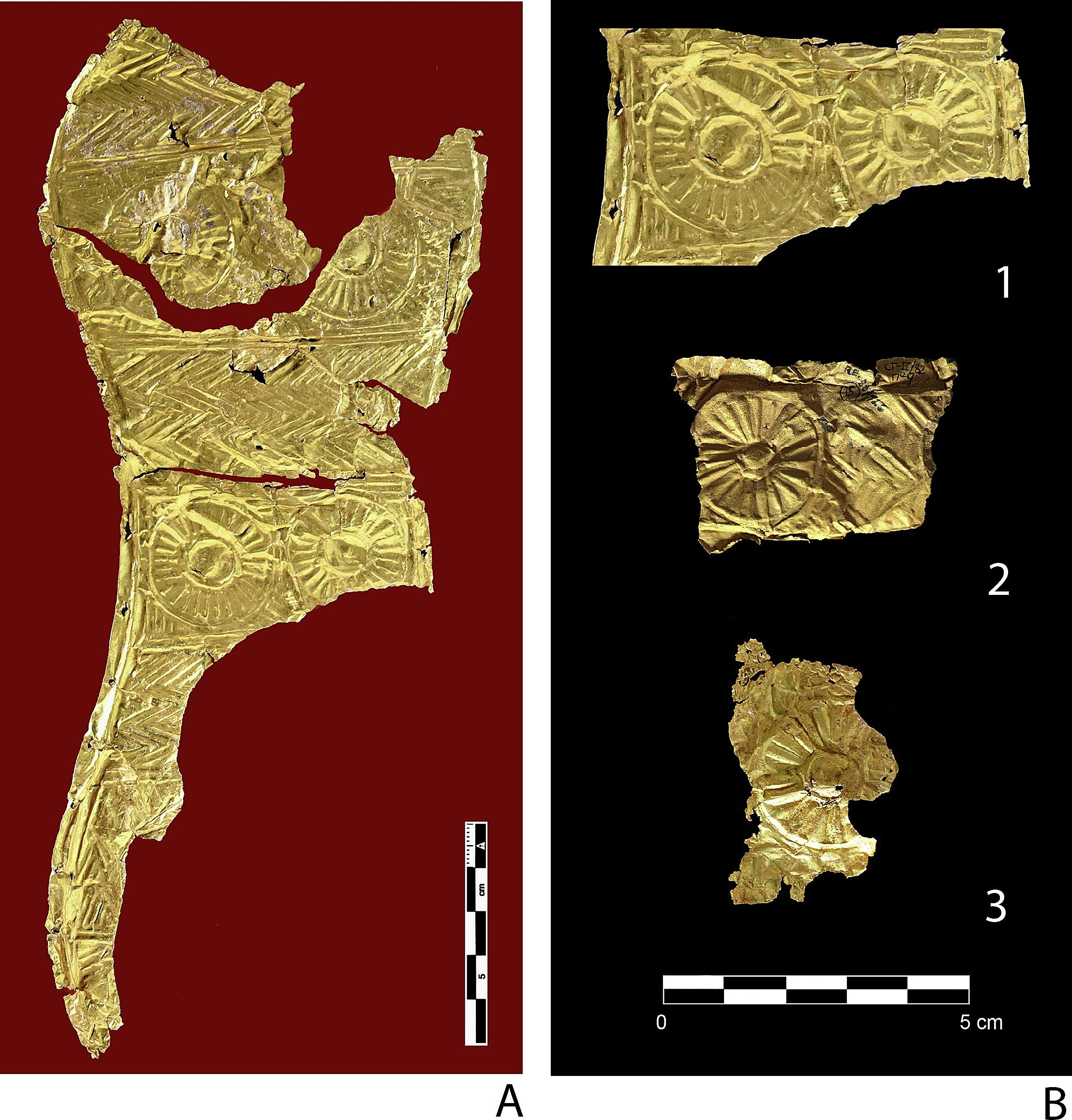
Gold foil artefacts

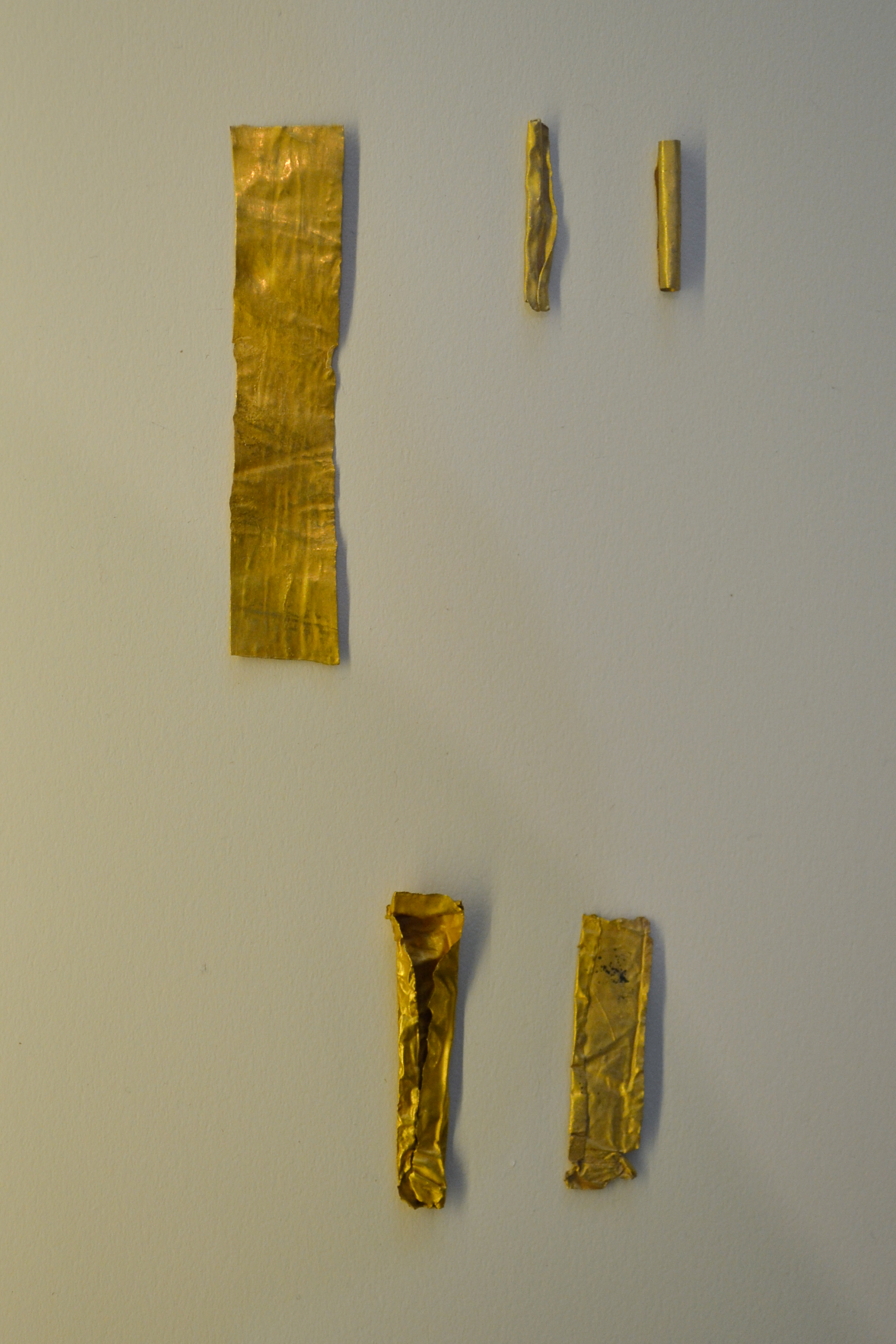
Gold foil artefacts

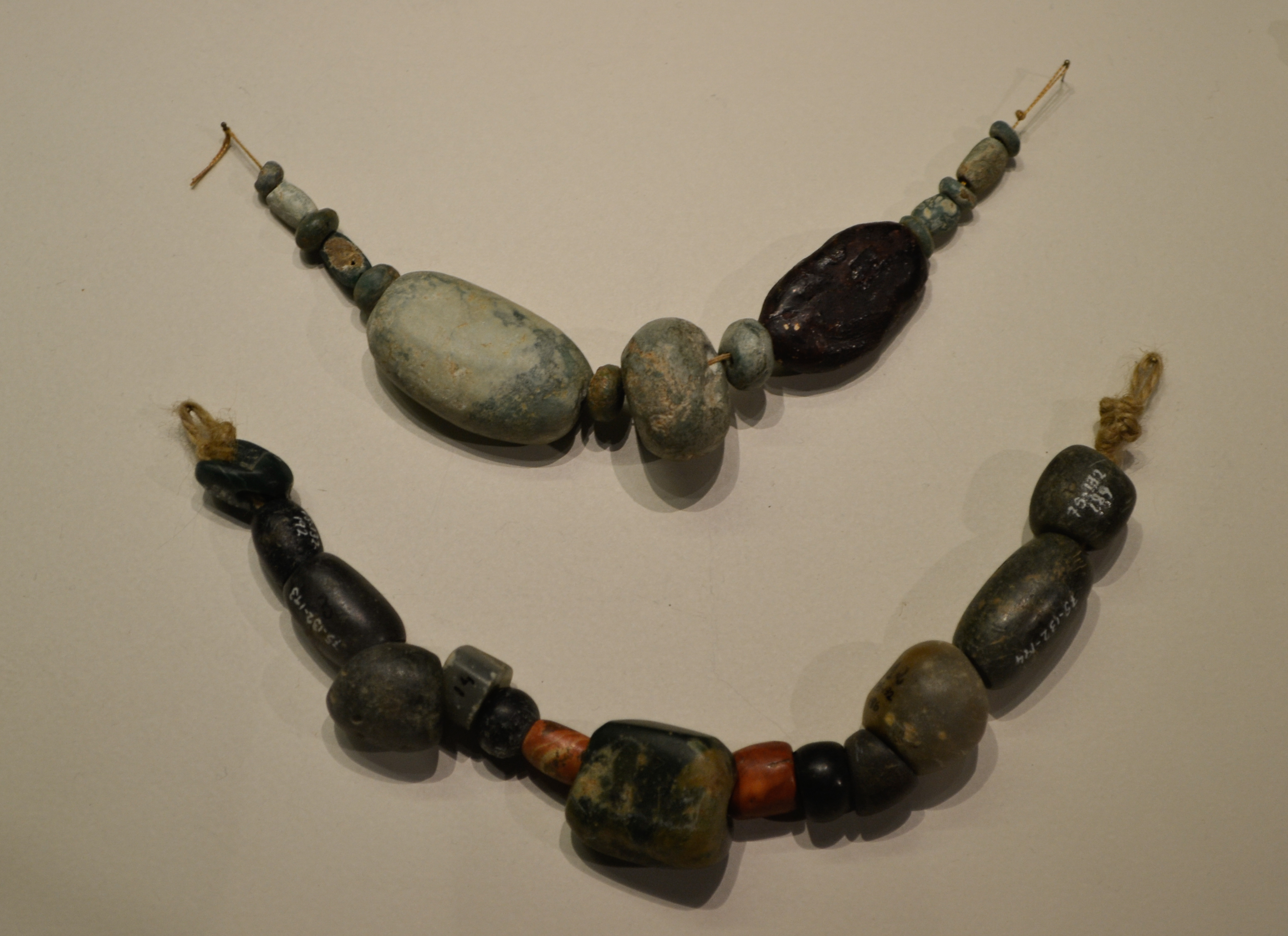
Variscite and amber jewellery

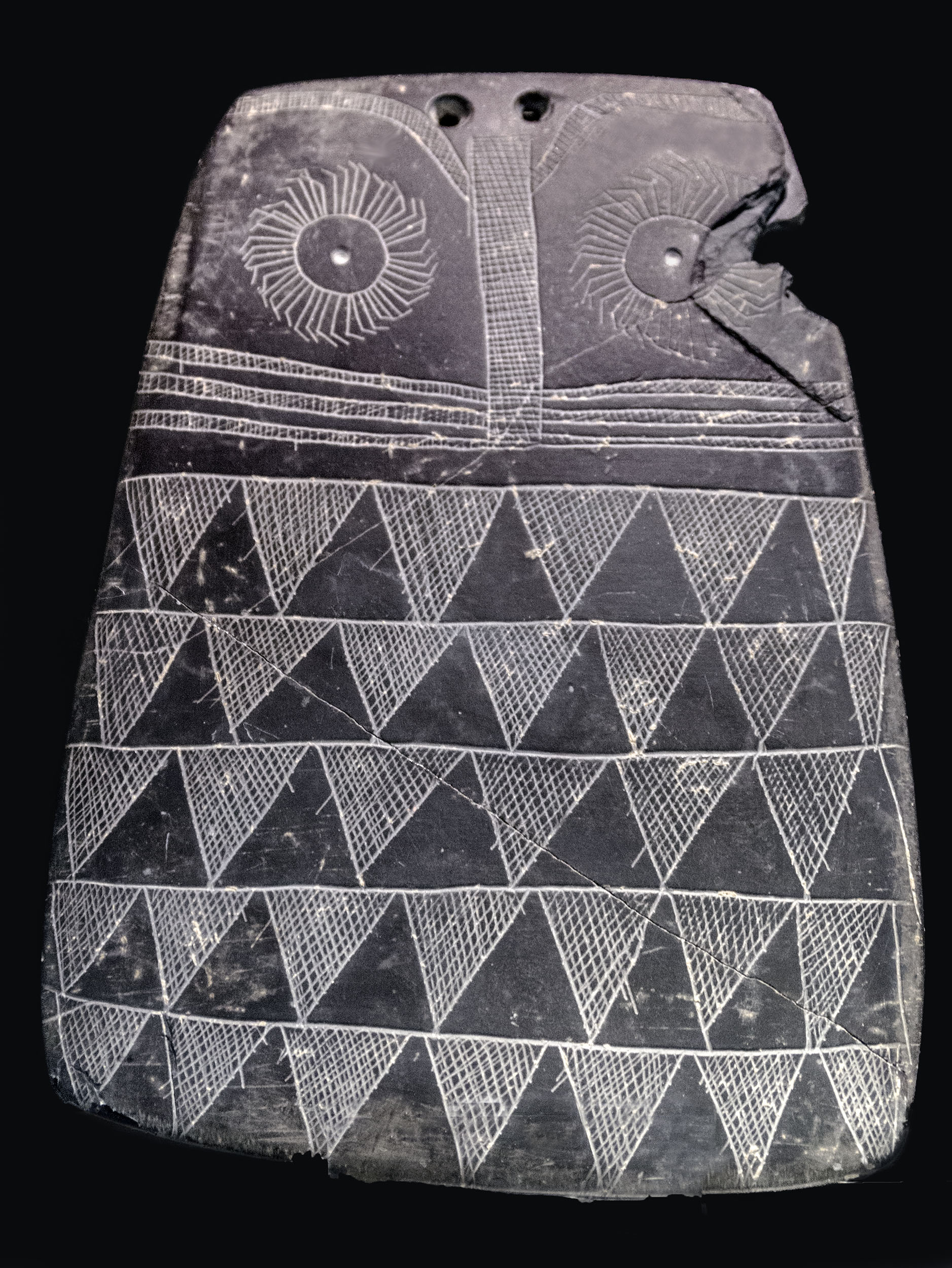
'Placa de Valencina'

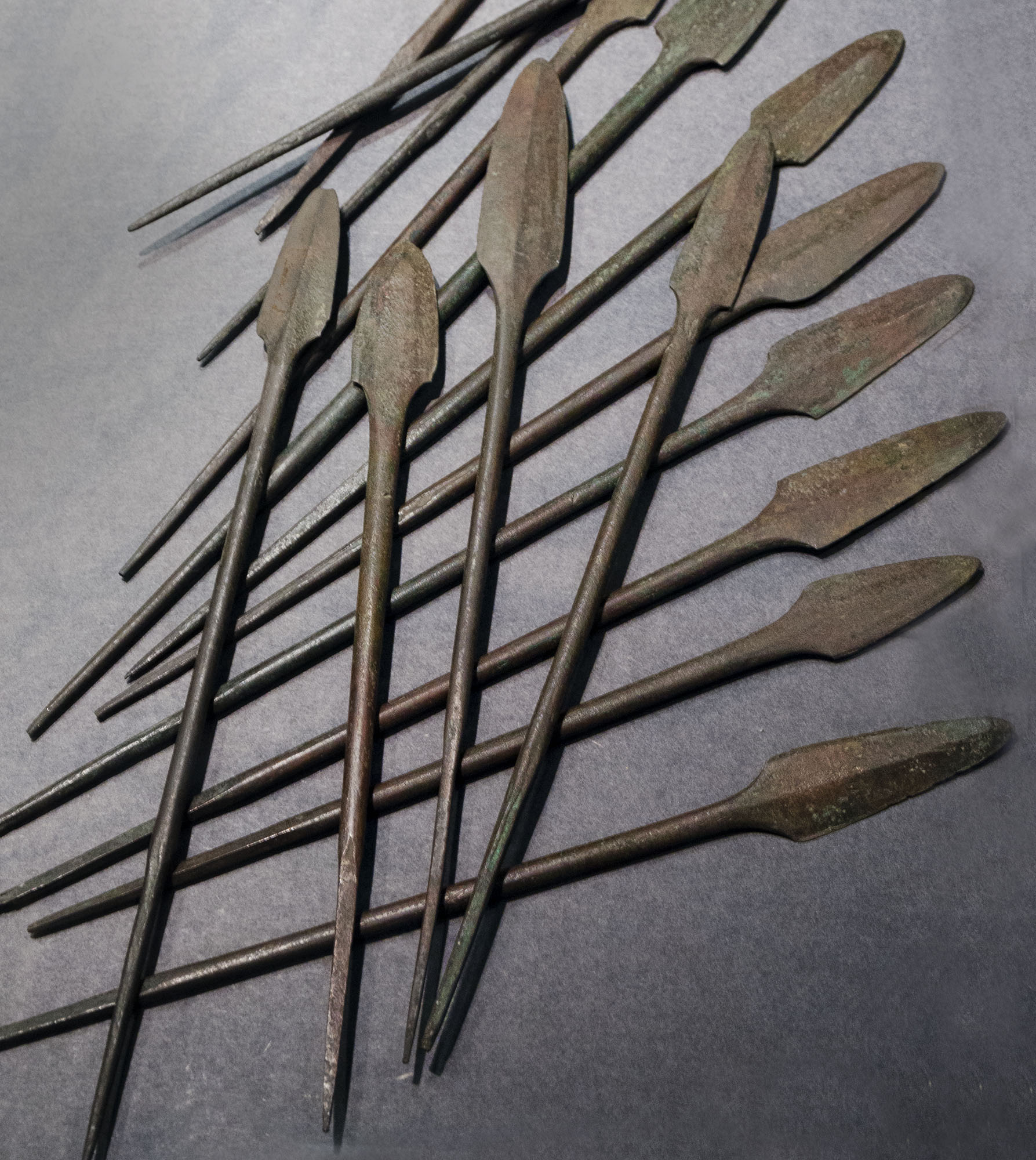
Copper javelins

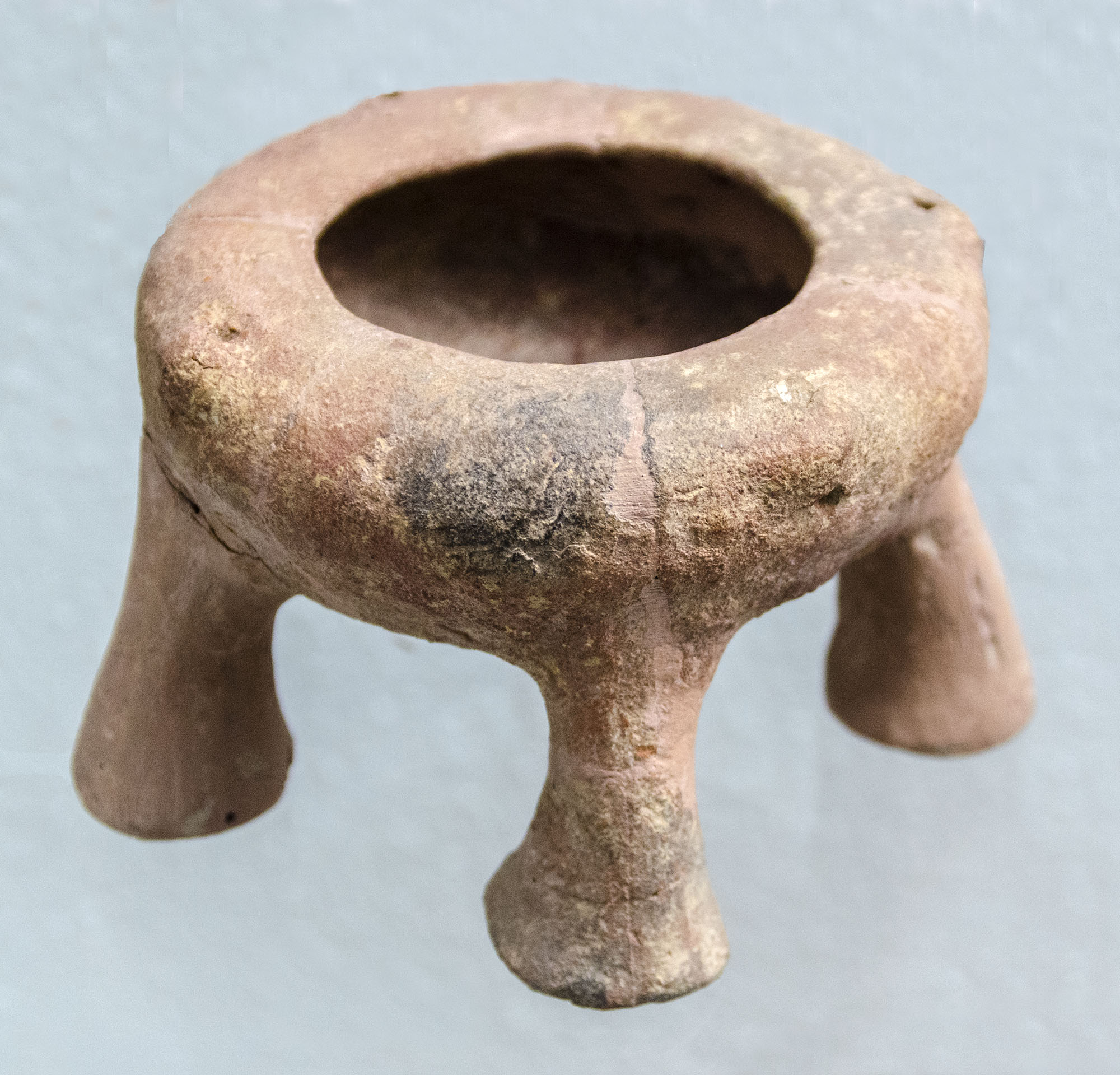
Ceramic vessel

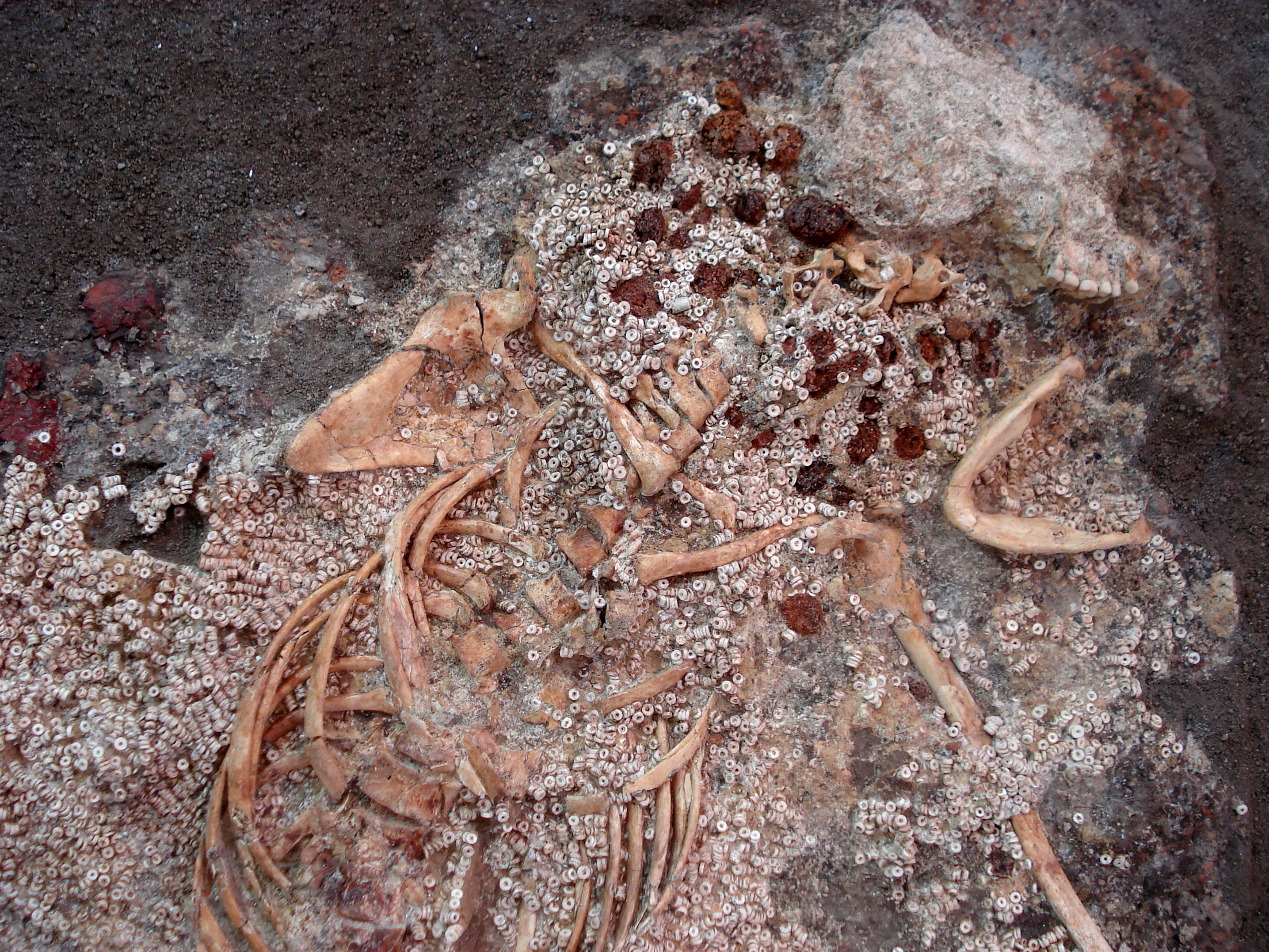
Human remains with remains of a dress made from amber and shell beads, Tholos de Montelirio

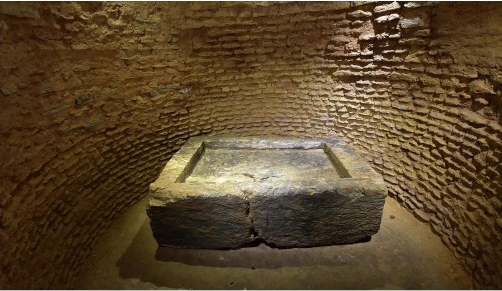
Stone basin in the Matàrrubilla dolmen

== See also ==
- Prehistoric Iberia
- Los Millares
- Castro of Zambujal
- Tholos de El Romeral
- Megalithic Monuments of Alcalar
- List of municipalities in Seville
