= Dolmen de la Pastora =

Prehistoric passage grave in Spain

- Cueva de la Pastora
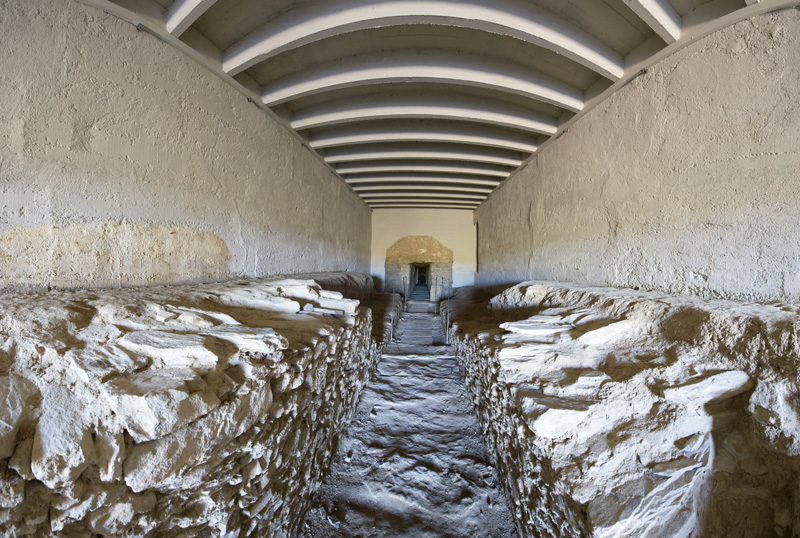
- Entrance to the Dolmen

- Location in Andalusia, Spain
- 37.41319°N 6.06444°W
- Type: Tomb
- Periods: Bronze Age
- Location: Andalusia, Spain

History
- Built: c. 3000 BC

Site notes
- Discovered: 1860

The Dolmen de la Pastora (also known as Cueva de la Pastora) is a prehistoric passage grave at Valencina de la Concepción near Seville, Spain. It has been dated to the Chalcolithic Age.

== Description ==
The dolmen is under "La Pastora" mound at Valencina de la Concepción. It is a 43-metre long gallery, made with drystone walls and roofed with slabs of limestone and granite. The passage terminates in a circular funeral chamber with a diameter of 2.5 metres, roofed with a single granite capstone. The passage is orientated towards the sunset, unlike other similar tombs in the region which tend to face towards sunrise.

Excavations in the slope of the tumulus in 1860 yielded 27 copper arrow heads of the "javelin type".

== Gallery ==
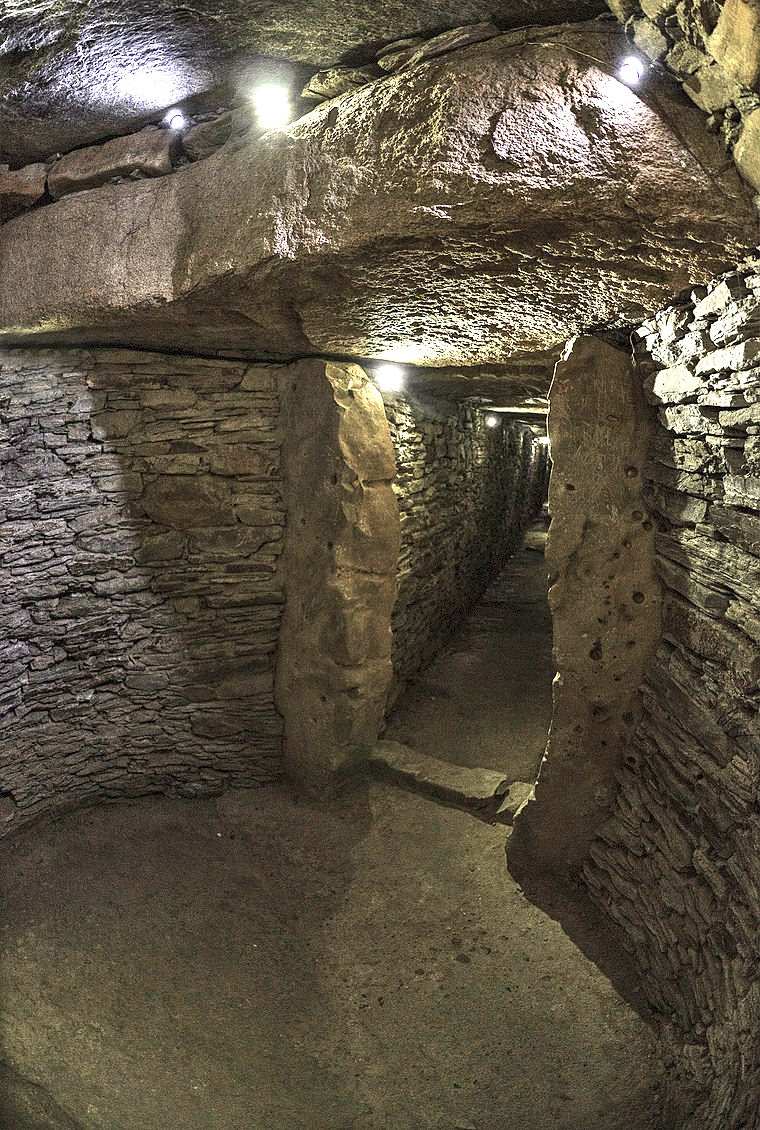
Central chamber

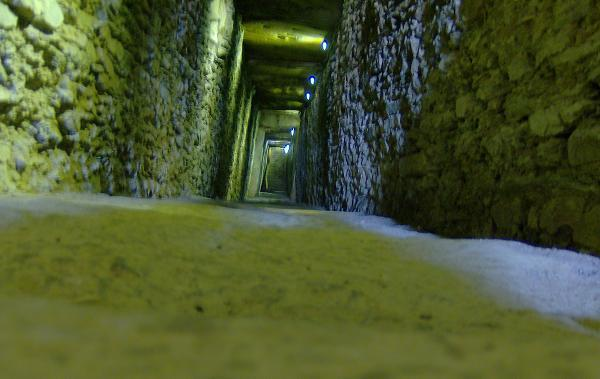
Interior passage

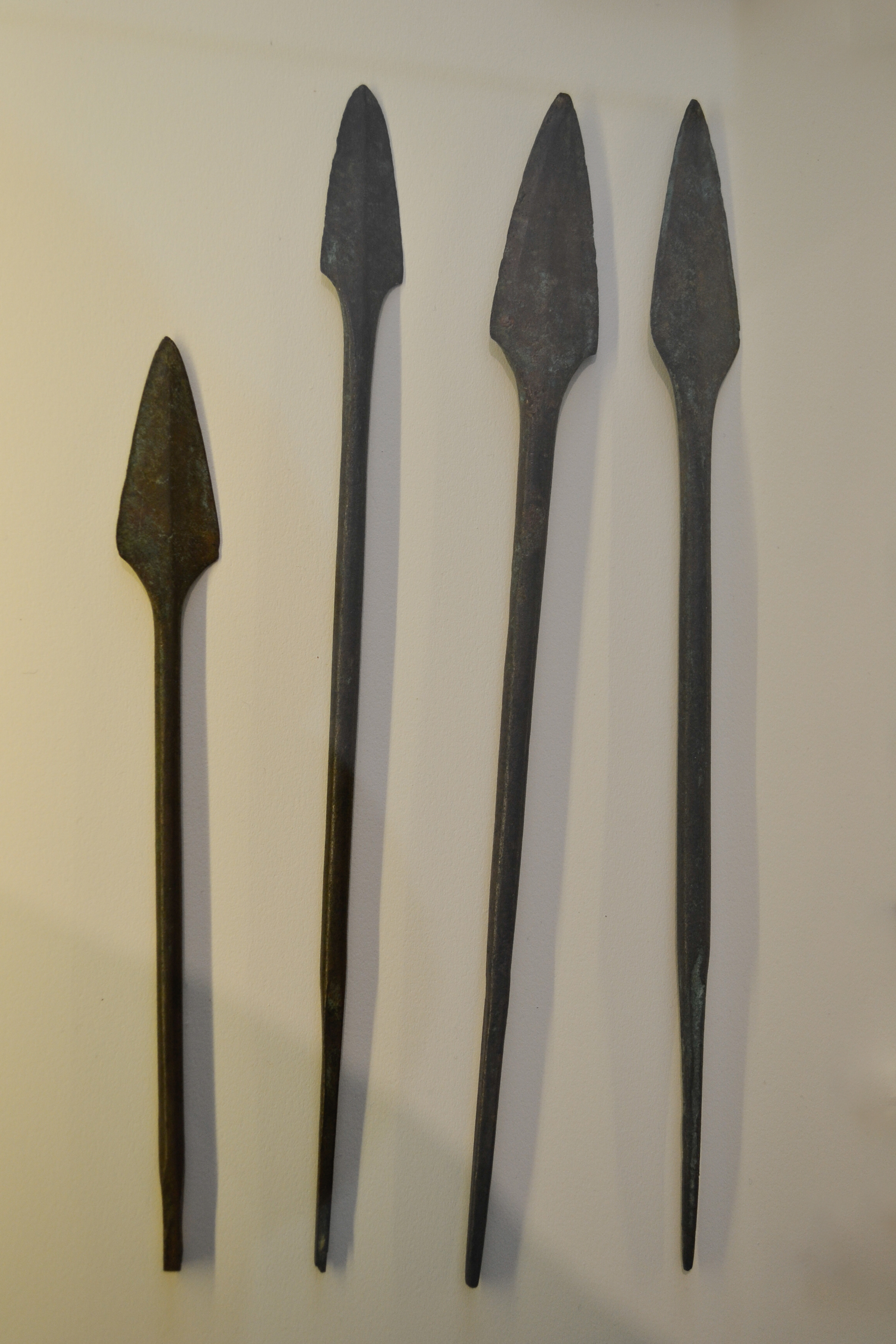
Copper javelin heads

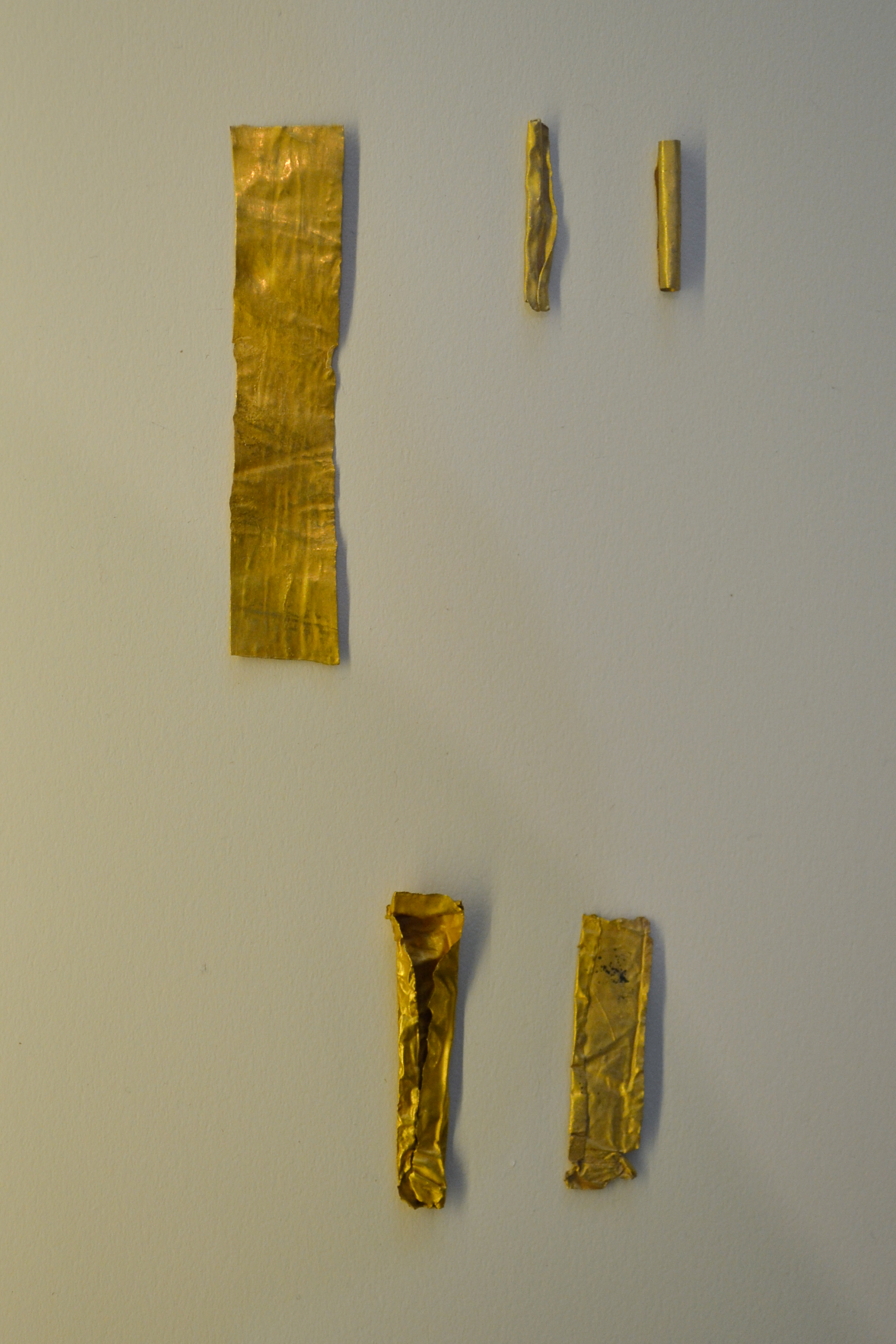
Gold foil artefacts

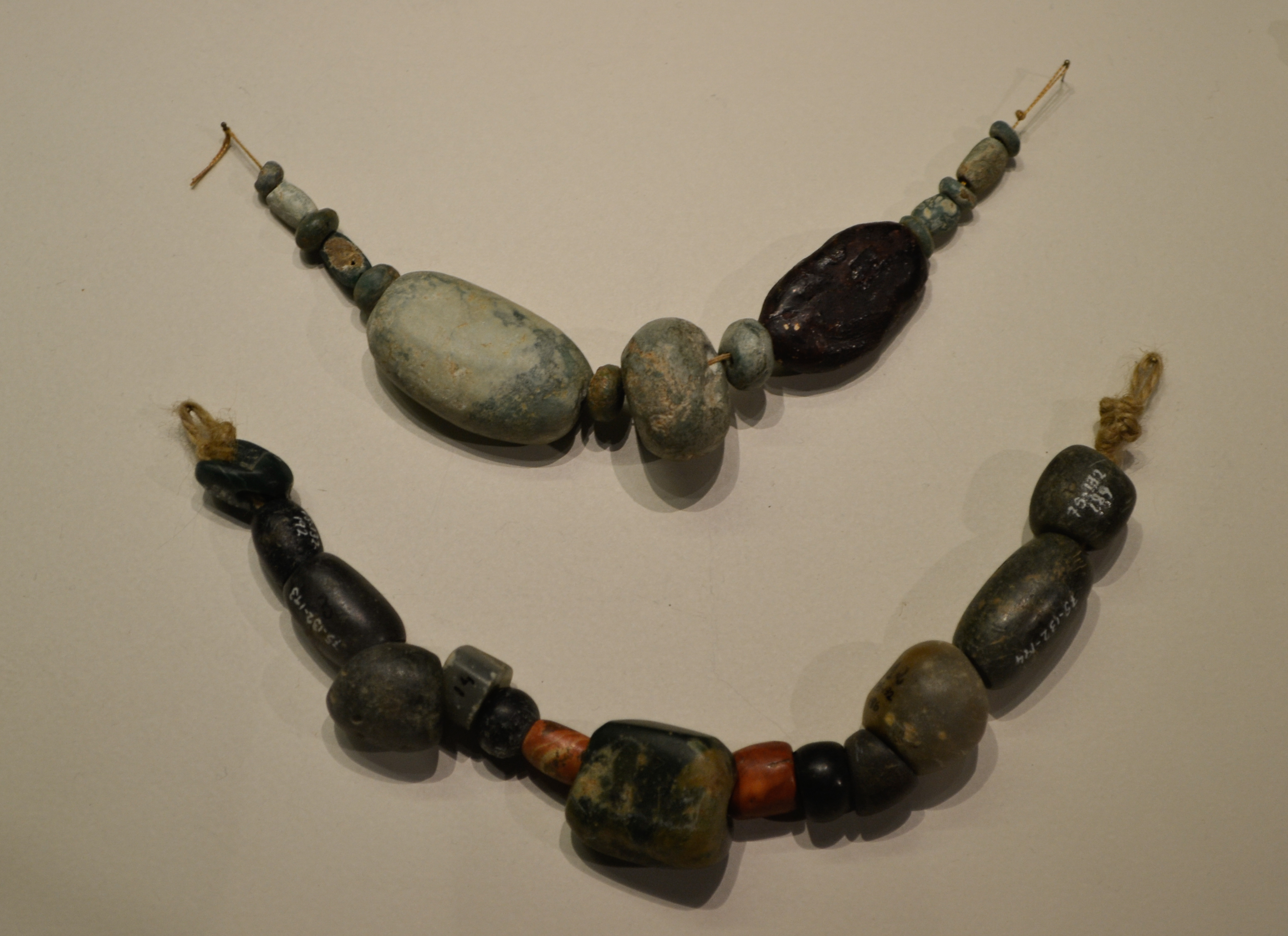
Variscite and amber jewellery

== See also ==
- Prehistoric Iberia
- Antequera Dolmens Site
- Tholos de El Romeral
- Bell Beaker culture
- Argaric culture
