= Tholos de El Romeral =

Megalithic burial mound in Andalusia, Spain

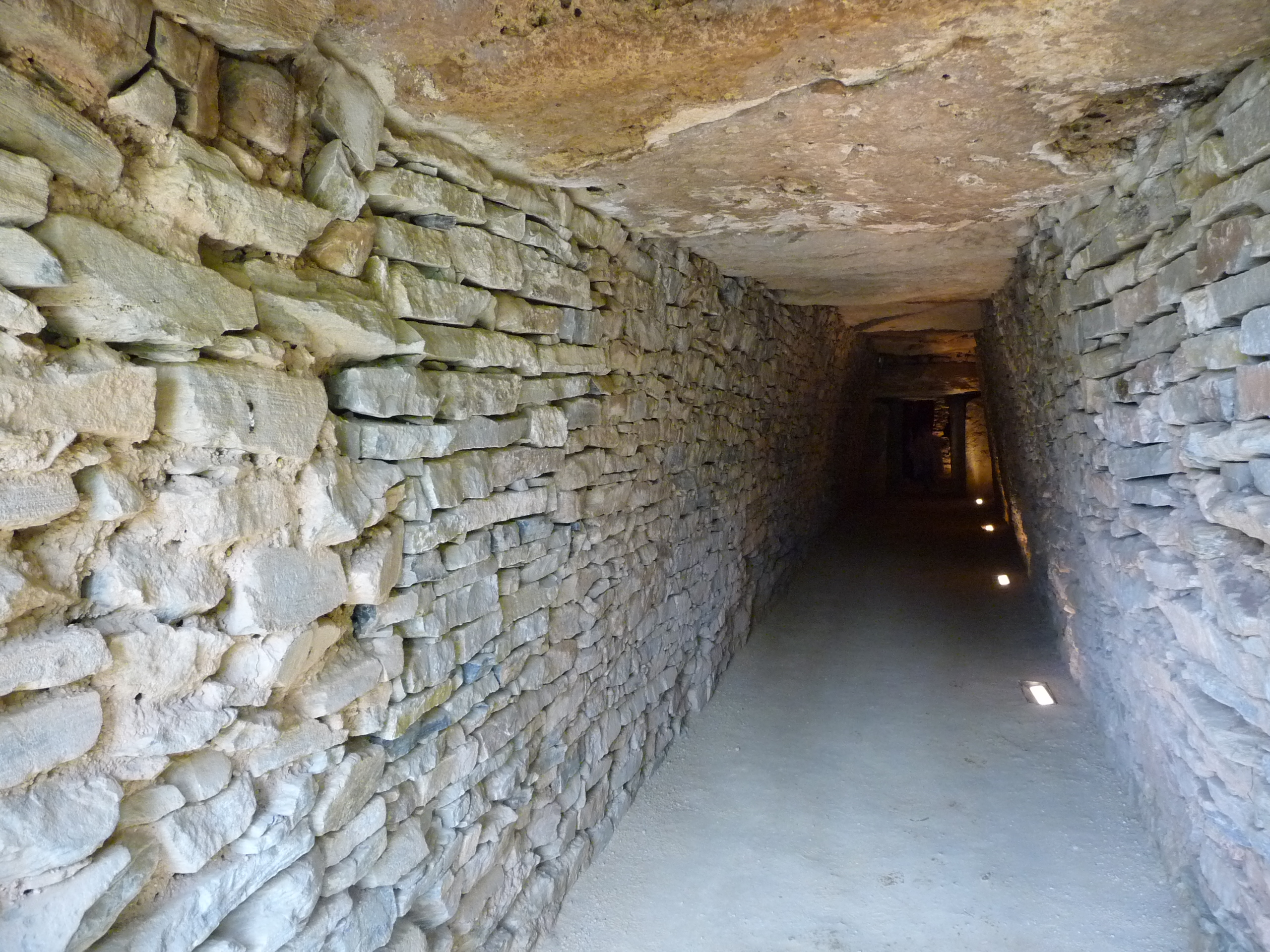
- Tholos de El Romeral; walls of small rubble, megalithic capstones
- Interactive map of Tholos de El Romeral
- Location: Andalusia, Spain
- Coordinates: 37°02′04″N 4°32′08″W
- Built: c. 1800 BC

UNESCO World Heritage Site
- Official name: Antequera Dolmens Site
- Type: Cultural
- Criteria: i, iii, iv
- Designated: 2016 (40th session)
- Reference no.: 1501-002
- Region: Europe and North America

Tholos de El Romeral, situated 2.5 kilometres (1.6 mi) north east of the town of Antequera (Andalusia), is one of the most important examples of early Bronze Age architecture in southern Europe. Tholos de El Romeral, also known as Cueva de Romeral (Cave of Romeral) and Dolmen de Romeral, is a megalithic burial site built around 1800 BC. It is one of three tombs in the region, the others being the Dolmen of Menga and the Dolmen de Viera, both situated to the south west.

In 2016, the dolmens of Menga, Viera, and El Romeral were all inscribed as a UNESCO World Heritage Site under the name Antequera Dolmens Site.

== Date ==
As late as the 20th century it was believed that the three megalithic tombs in the area (Dolmen of Menga, Dolmen de Viera, and Tholos de El Romeral) originated from the same period. However, subsequent research supports widely spaced dates between the first two (around 3800 BC) and the construction of Tholos de El Romeral which is now thought to have been built around 1800 BC. It is recognised and attributed to the wider culture of the Los Millares, which had its centre more than 200 kilometres to the east. The main reasons for this are the different stone materials used and the differing floor plans of the chambers, as the other two tombs have rectangular chambers.

== Architecture ==
Tholos de El Romeral is a chambered cairn covered by a mound. It consists of a long corridor with drystone walls made of small stones and a ceilings made of megalithic slabs. The corridor culminates with two consecutive round beehive-like chambers. The larger chamber has a diameter of approximately 4.2 metres (14 ft) and has corbelled walls built in the same way as the corridor, projecting inwards and culminating in a megalithic capstone. The floor of the corridor and main chamber are made of packed earth. The second chamber is linked to the first by a rectangular corridor (and is not accessible to the public). It has a diameter of approximately 2 metres (6 ft 7 in), contains a stone slab bier, and the floor of the small room is covered with stone slabs. Bones and grave goods were found within the dolmen.

Although it is believed that these megalithic buildings had different uses (tombs, temples, etc.) the Romeral Dolmen is certainly a burial site because human remains, shells, and two types of ceramics were found within it.

== Gallery ==
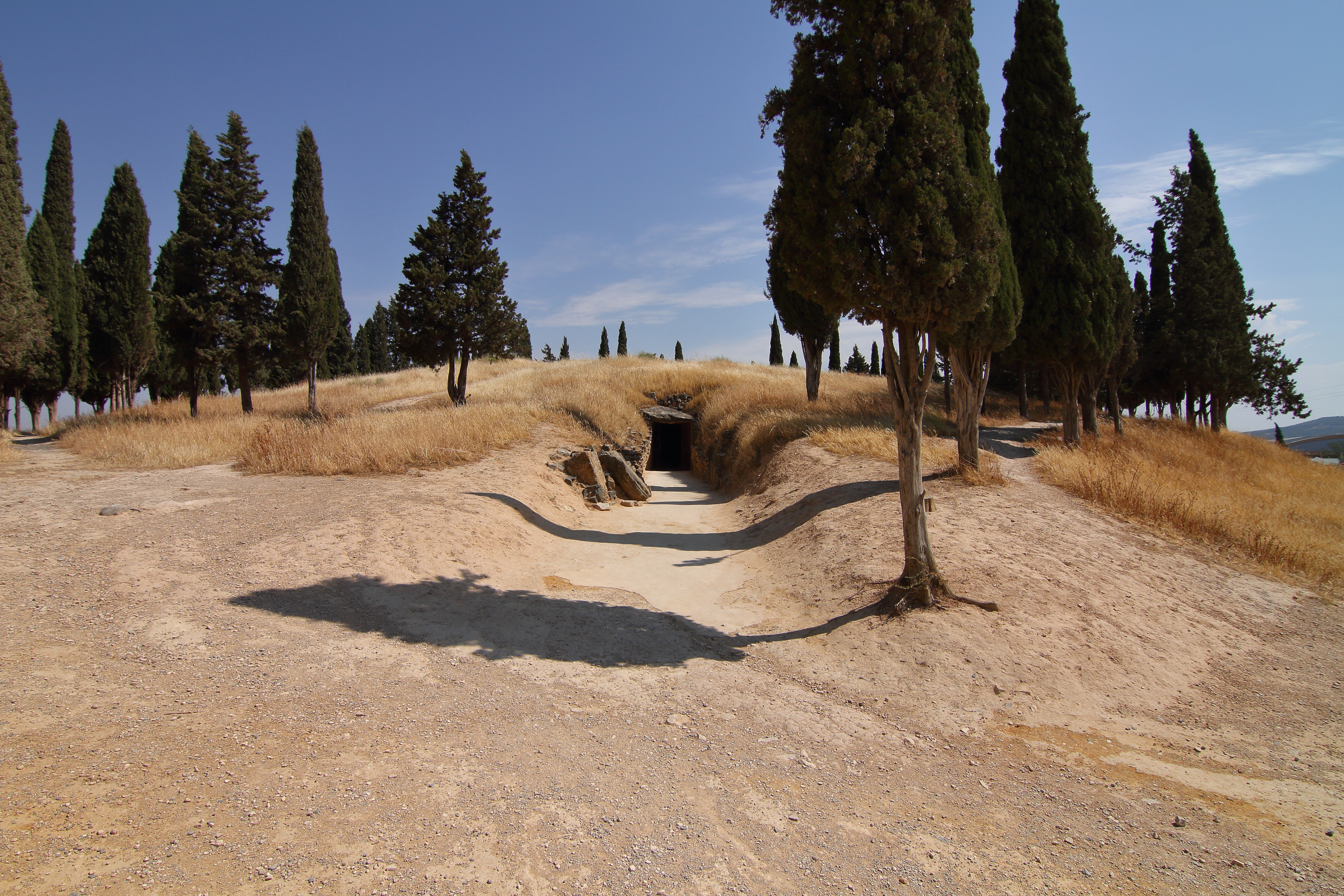
Exterior view

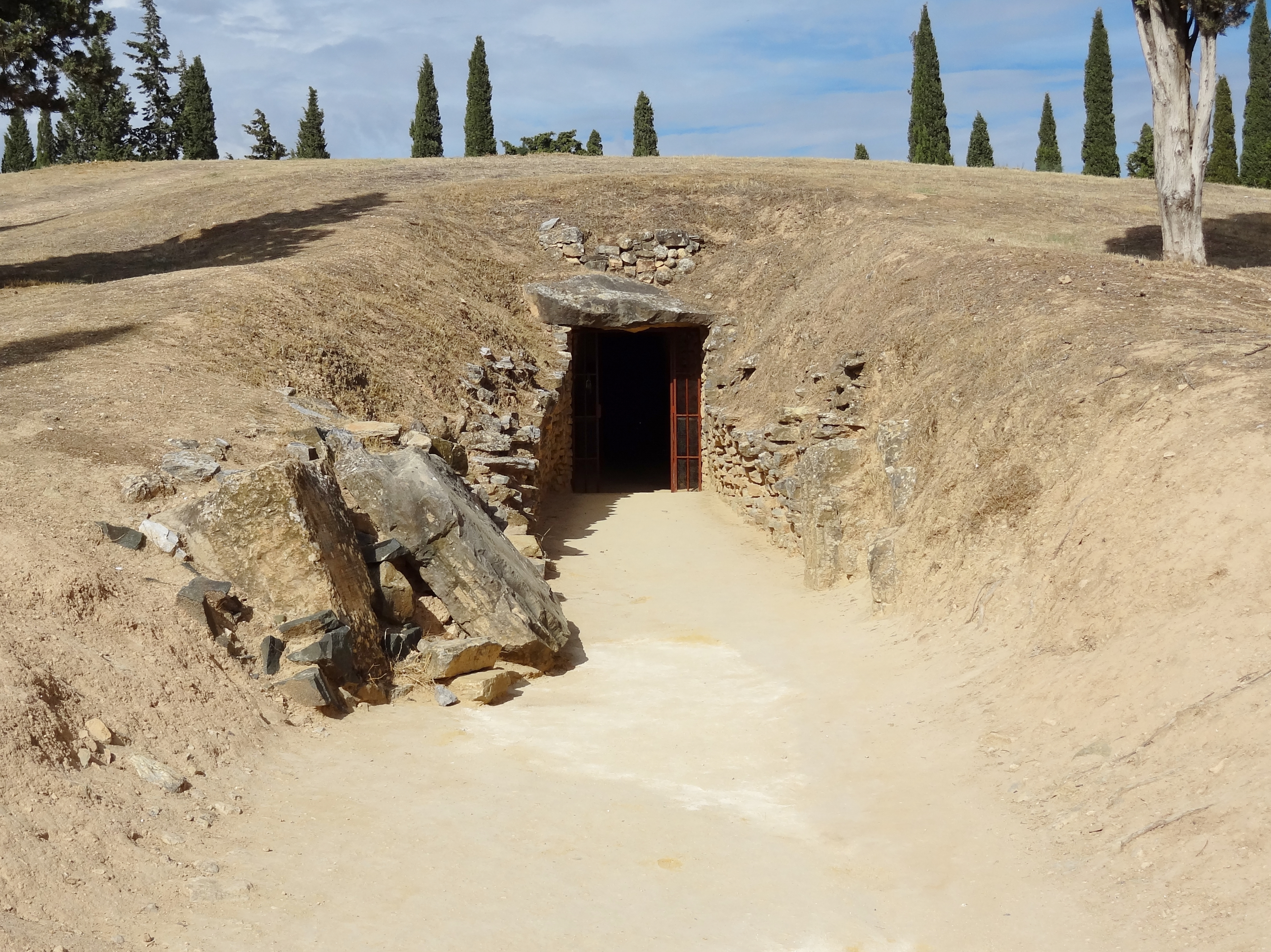
Exterior view

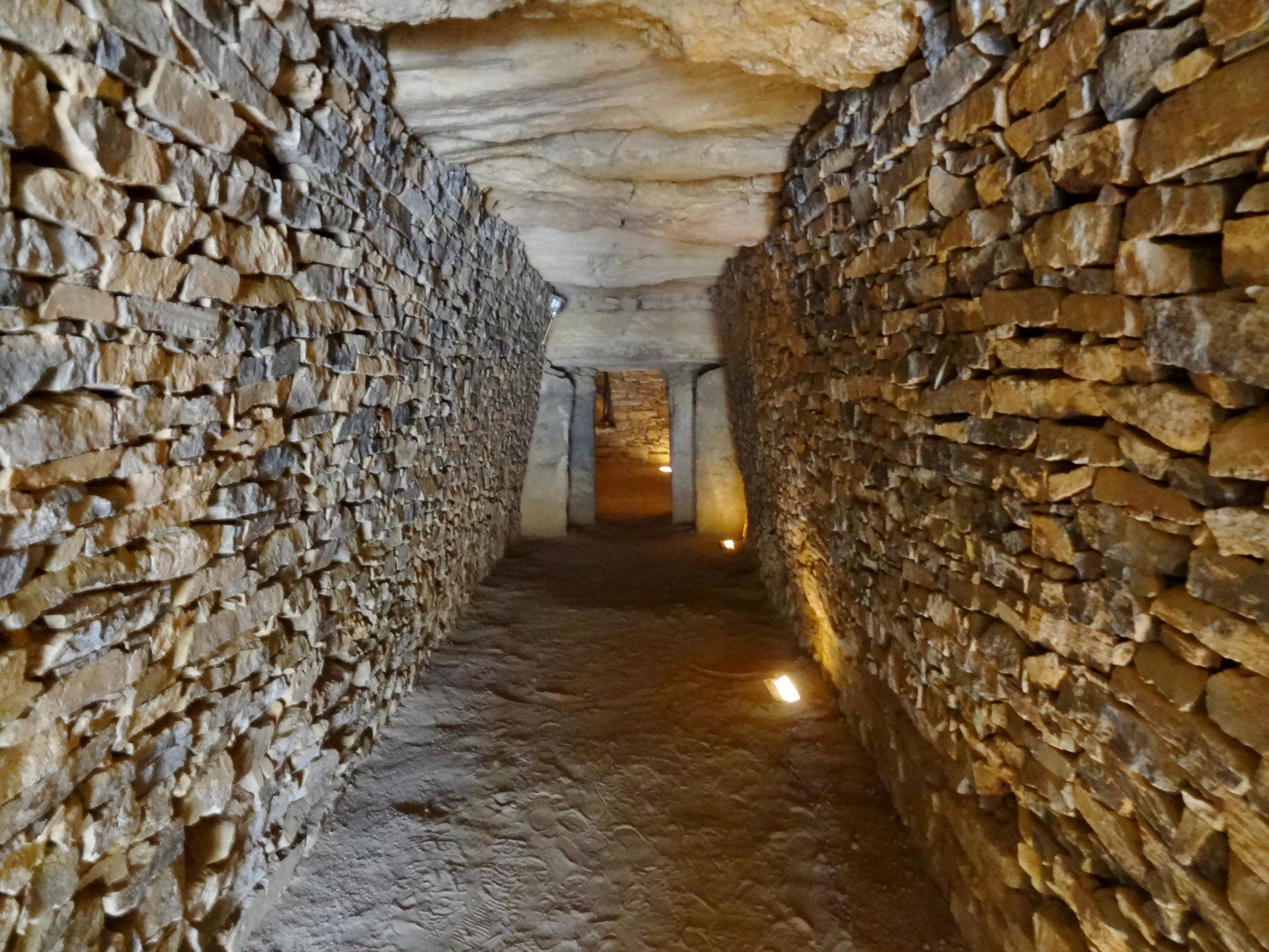
Entrance passage

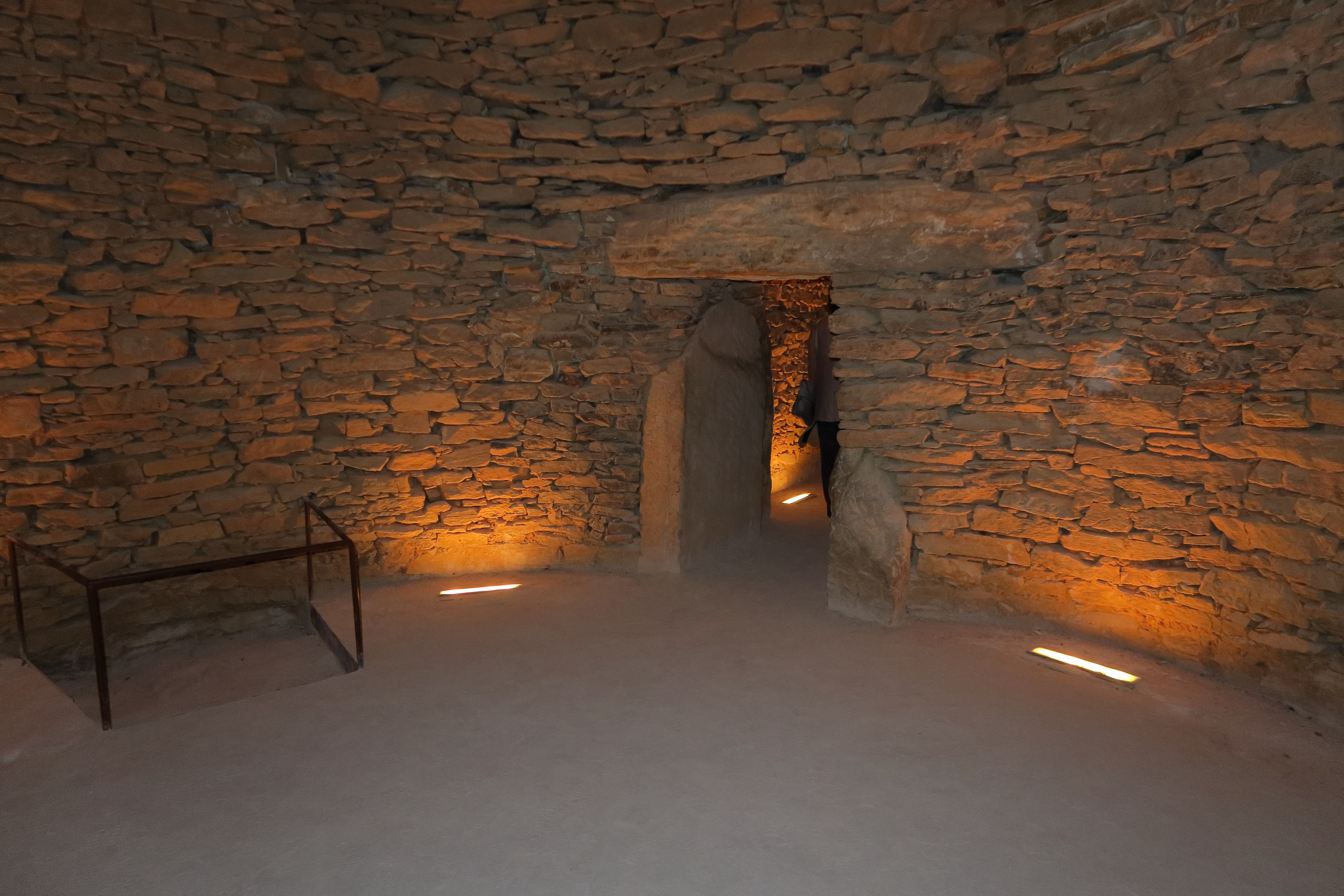
Interior chamber

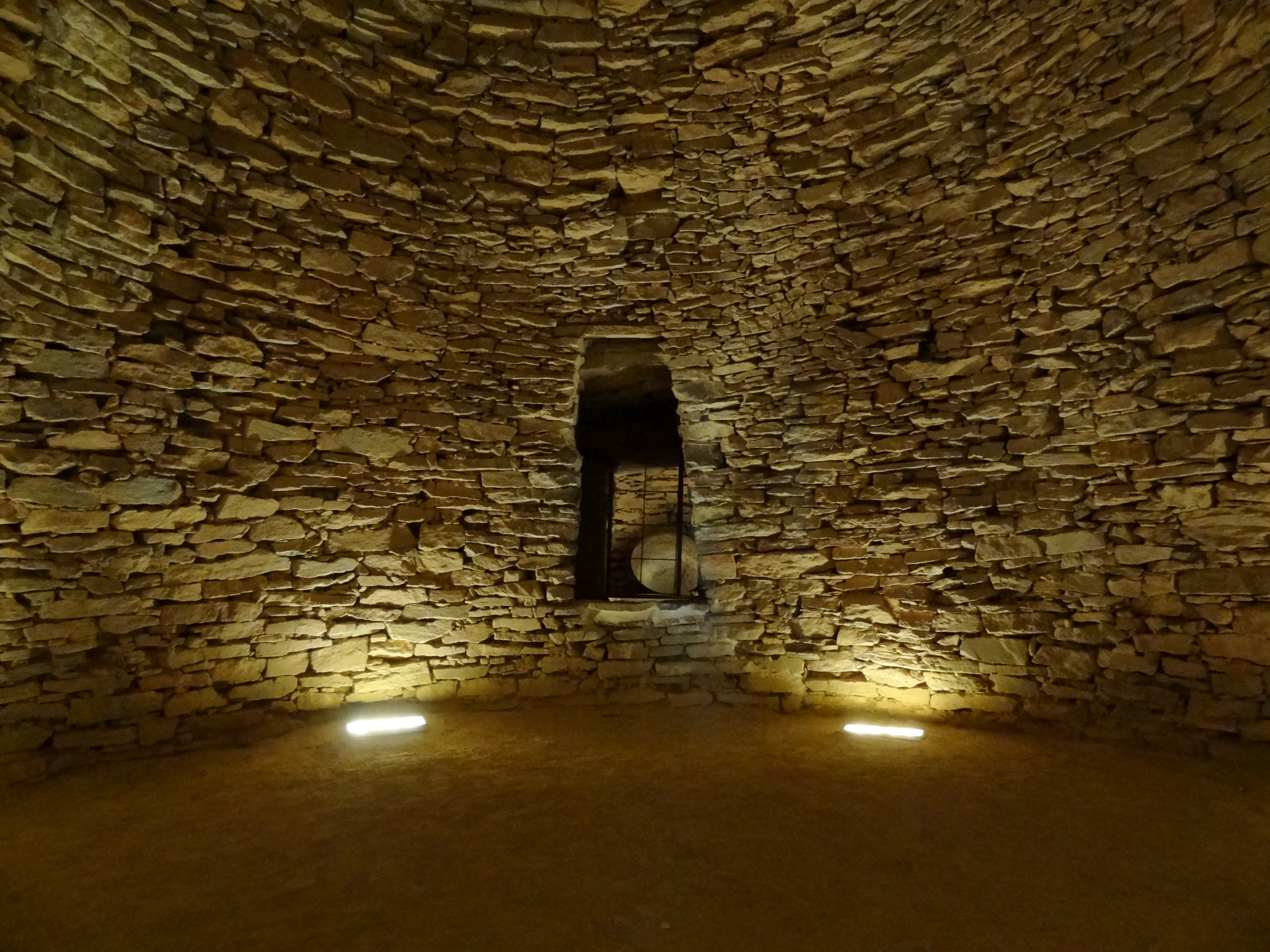
Interior chamber

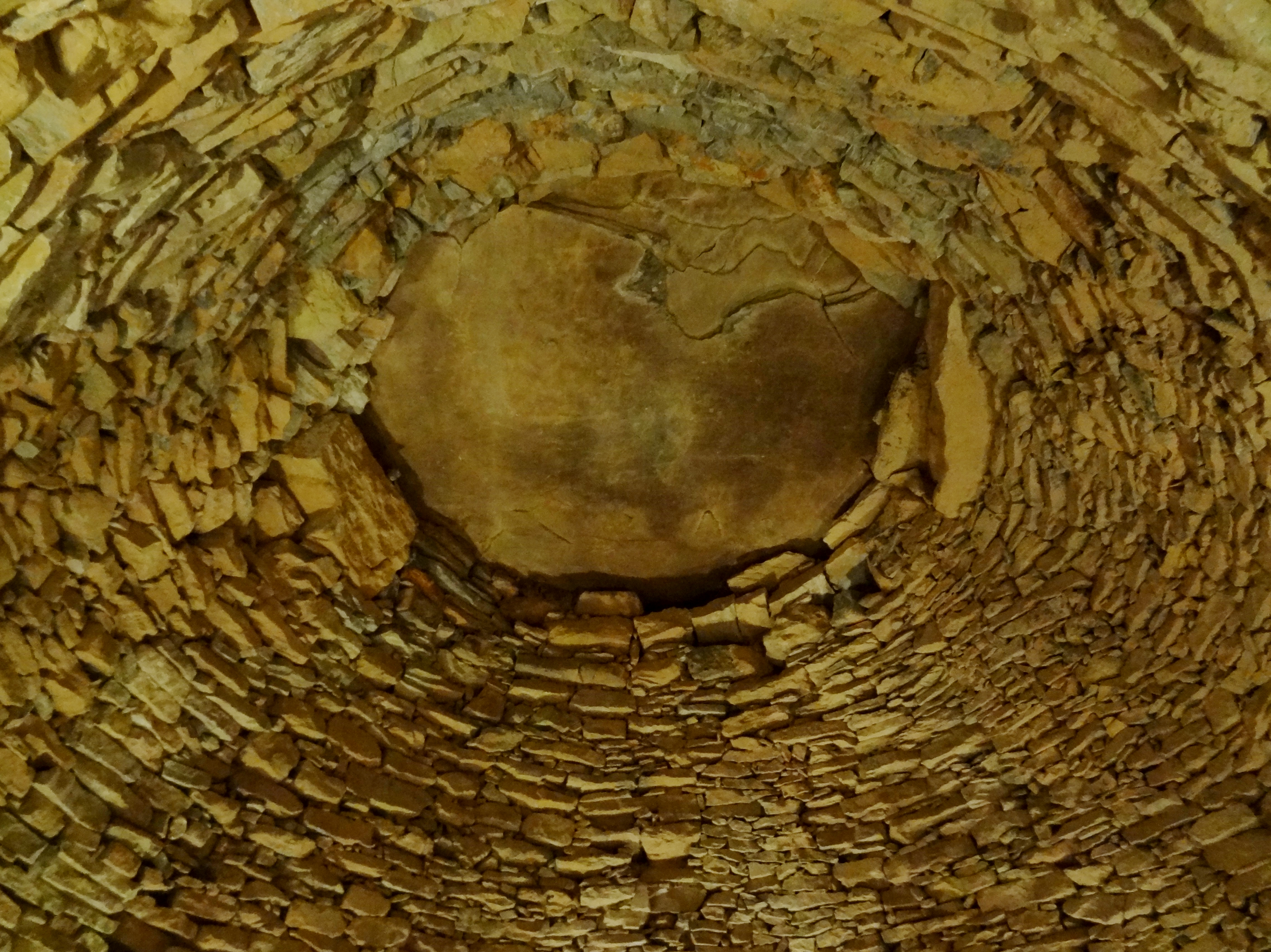
Roof of the tholos

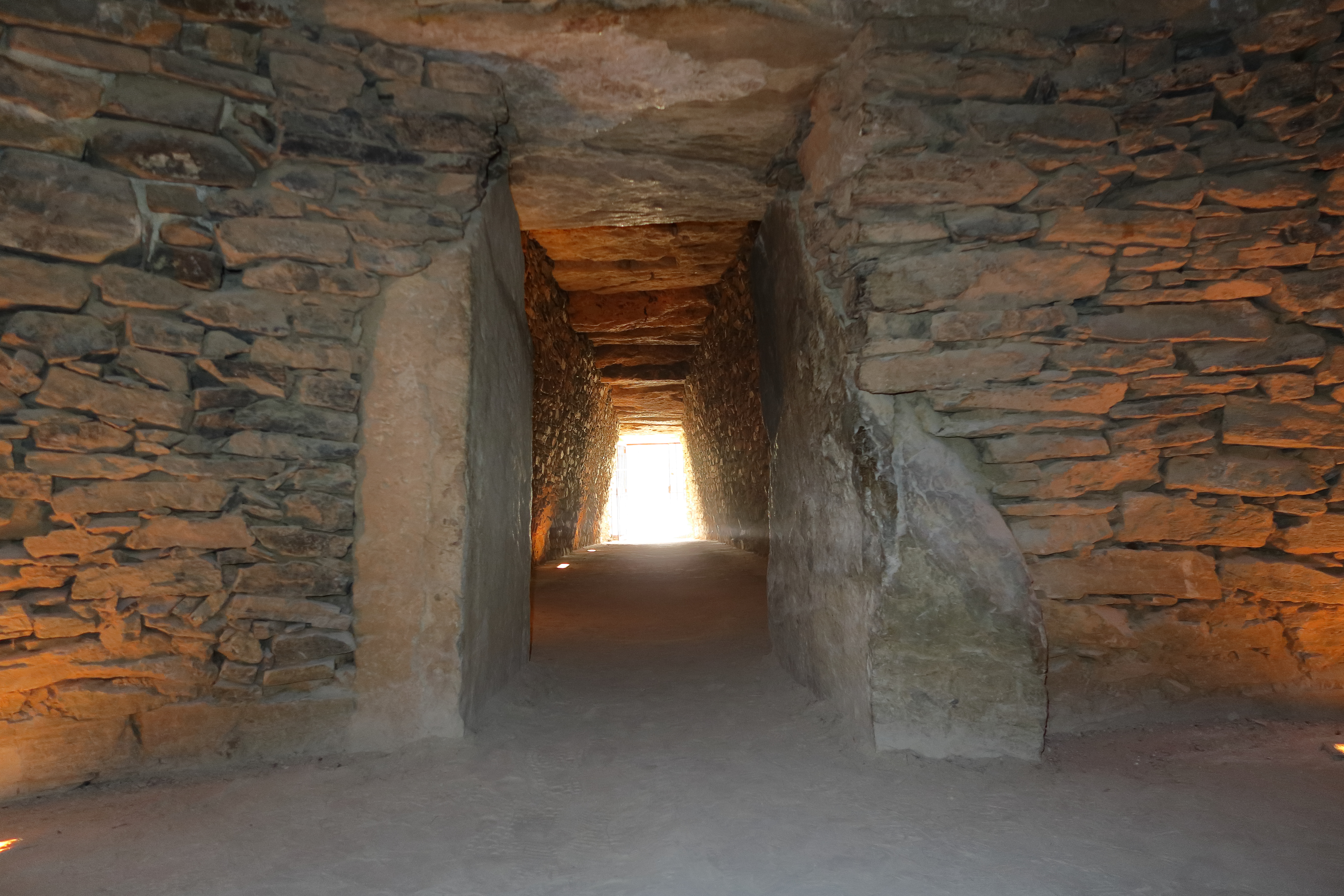
Entrance passage

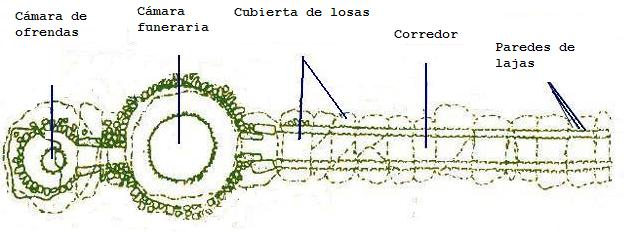
Plan

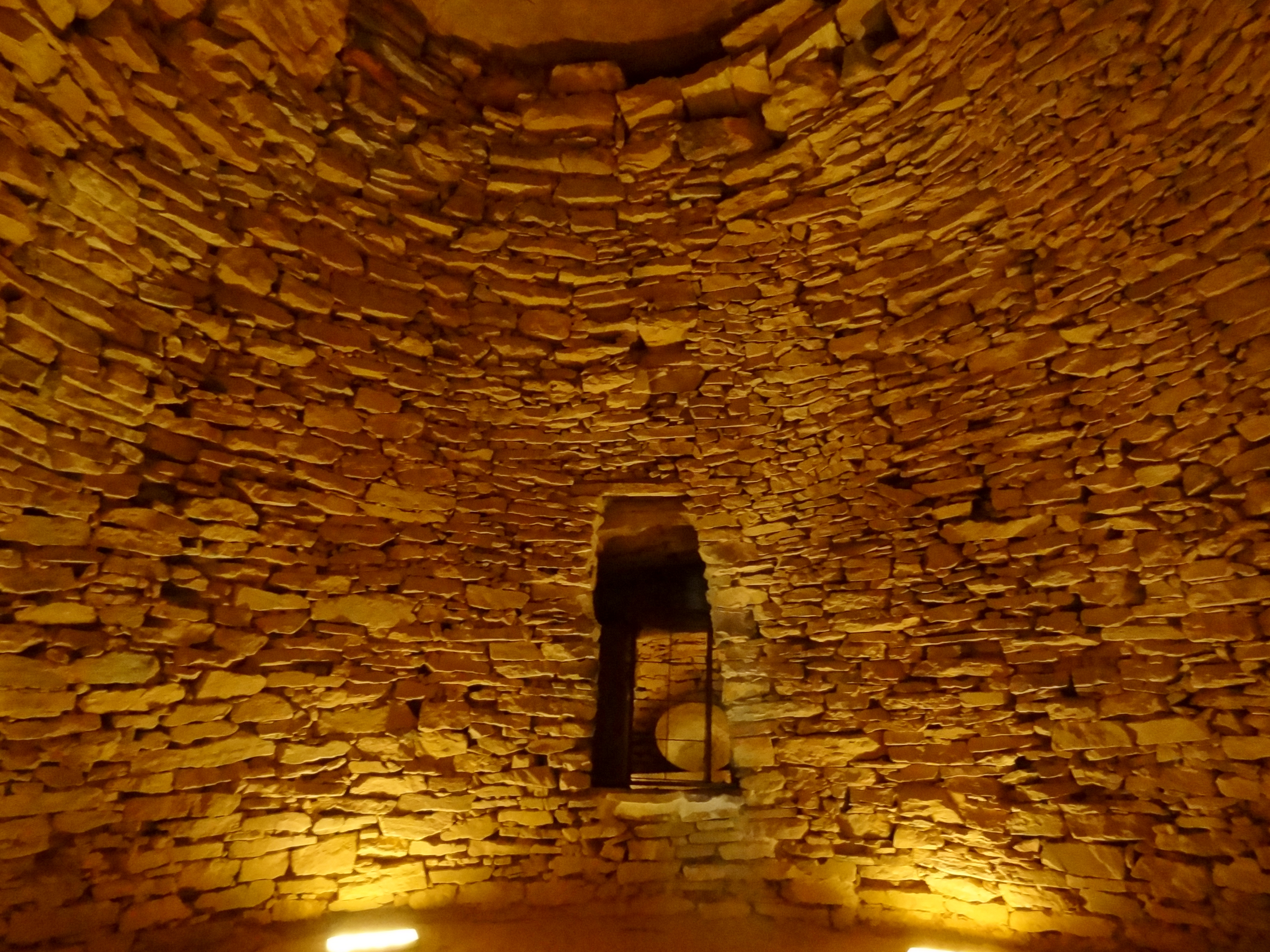

== See also ==
- Megalithic Monuments of Alcalar
- Dolmen de la Pastora
- Tholos do Barro
- Tholos of Montelirio
- Valencina de la Concepción
- Prehistoric Iberia
- Bell Beaker culture
- Treasury of Atreus
