= Tholos de Montelirio =

Archaeological site in Seville Province, Spain

Tholos de Montelirio is an archaeological site in Seville Province, Spain, at Valencina de la Concepción. It is a megalithic construction dated to 3,000–2,800 BC. The site was discovered in 1868, but has been abandoned for decades. Its excavation was resumed in 1980 due to the urban growth of Seville. Tholos de Montelirio is closed to the general public, but its objects can be viewed in the Archeological Museum of Seville.

== Site ==
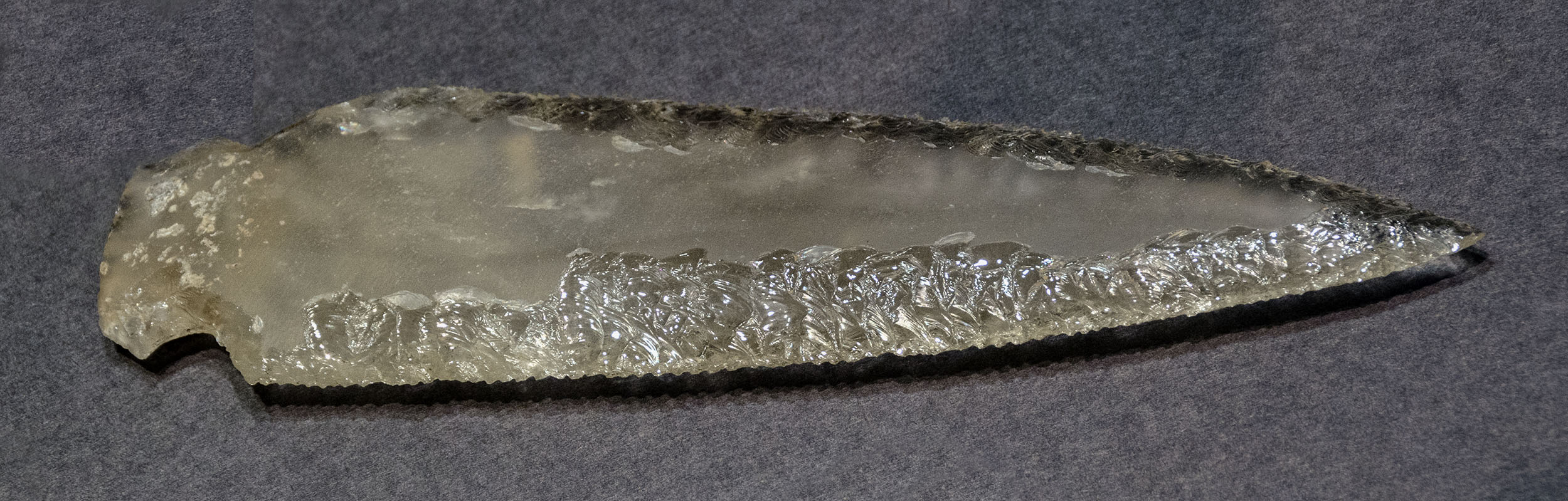
Rock crystal dagger from the tholos

The site is a megalithic construction dated to around 3000–2800 BC and composed of an open-air "corridor" about 40 meters long leading to two underground chambers that were supported during the site's construction by wooden pillars. Among the artifacts is a dagger with a blade made of rock crystal and an ivory handle decorated with 90 perforated discoid beads made of nacre. The main chamber contains human bodies and was covered with a red patina of cinnabar and decorated with sun motifs. The research by the University of Seville determined that during the winter solstice the sun was beaming for a few minutes through the entrance corridor, illuminating the funeral chamber and hitting a stele that represented the mother goddess. A Bayesian model based on 22 radiocarbon dates on human bone suggested that the use of Tholos de Montelirio started in 2875–2700 BC and ended in 2805–2635 BC.

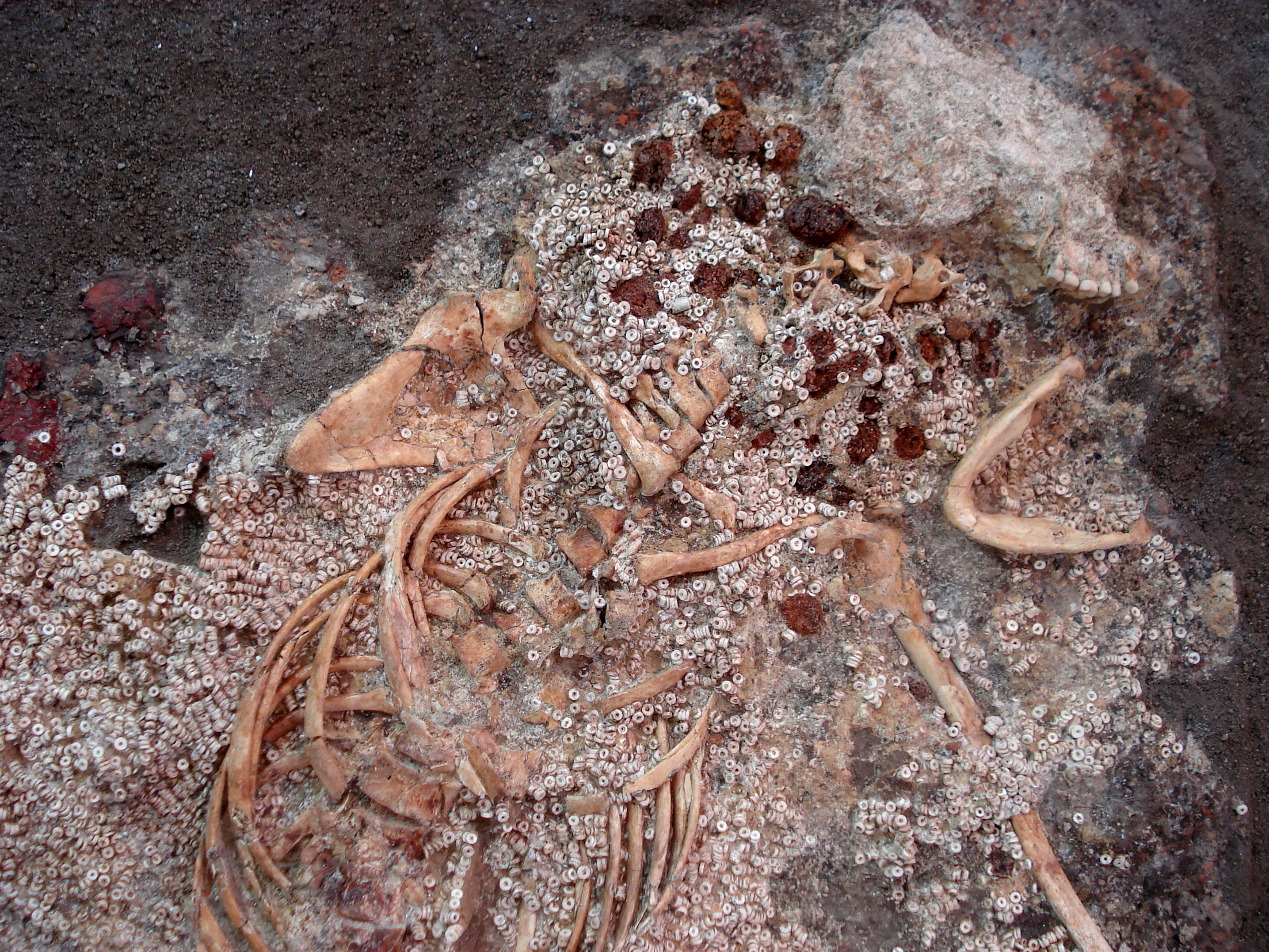
Human remains with remains of a dress made from amber and shell beads

All human remains at the site were found to contain "very high levels" of mercury. This is believed to be either due to their continuous exposure to mercury-containing cinnabar or because their skin was painted with mercury. Additionally, evidence of osteoarthritis was found in bones, which may indicate that those humans either walked a lot or were dancers.

=== Ivory Lady ===
In 2008 the skeleton of a high-ranking individual buried in the site's tomb was discovered and was thought to be a man. Because of surrounding ivory artifacts, the skeleton has been dubbed the Ivory Man. However, in 2021 it was announced that, based on the analysis of sex-specific amelogenin peptide in tooth enamel, the skeleton is that of a woman. The corresponding results were published in 2023 by Nature and a new name for the skeleton, the Ivory Lady, was proposed.

== Gallery ==
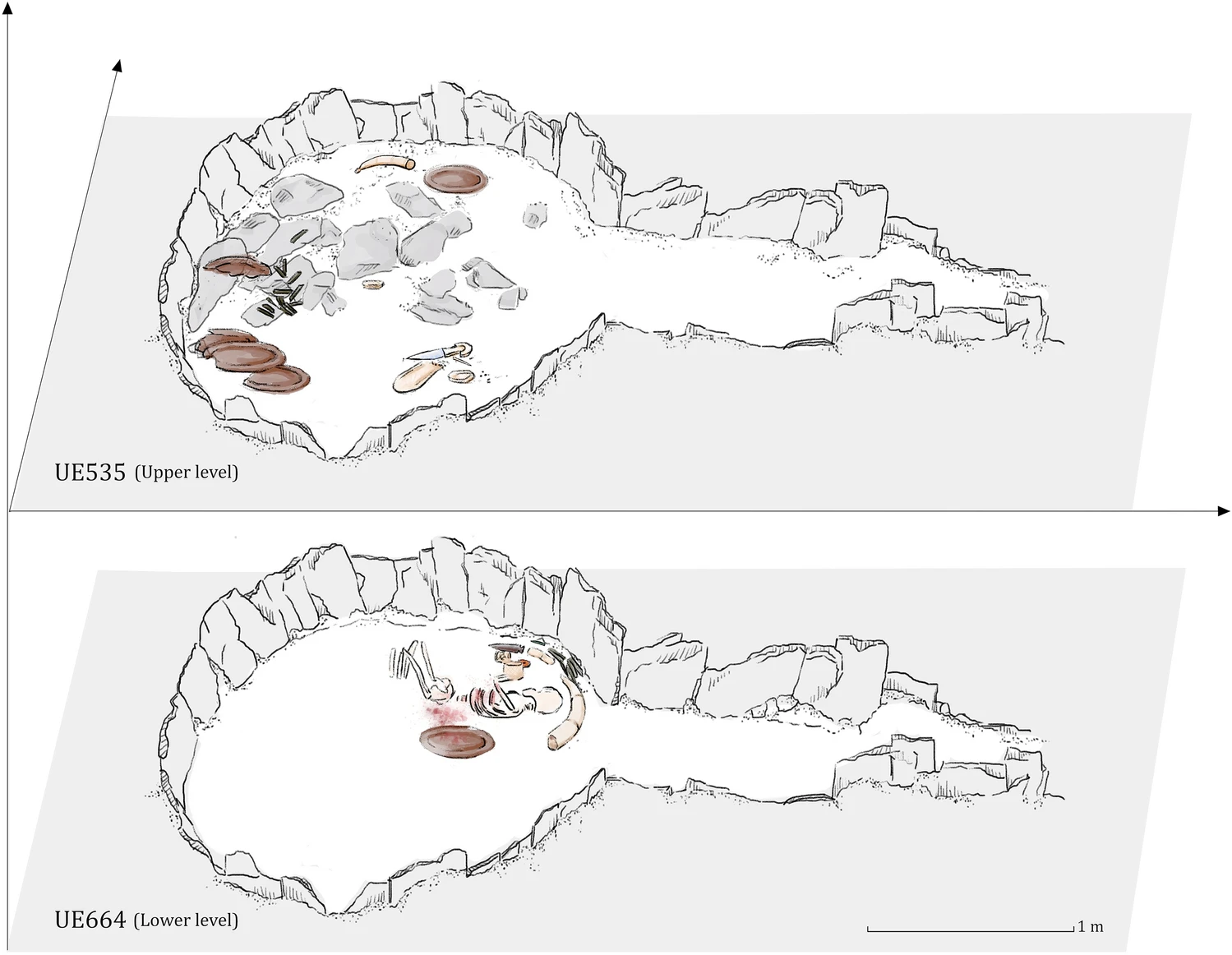
Structure 10.049, plans of the lower and upper levels

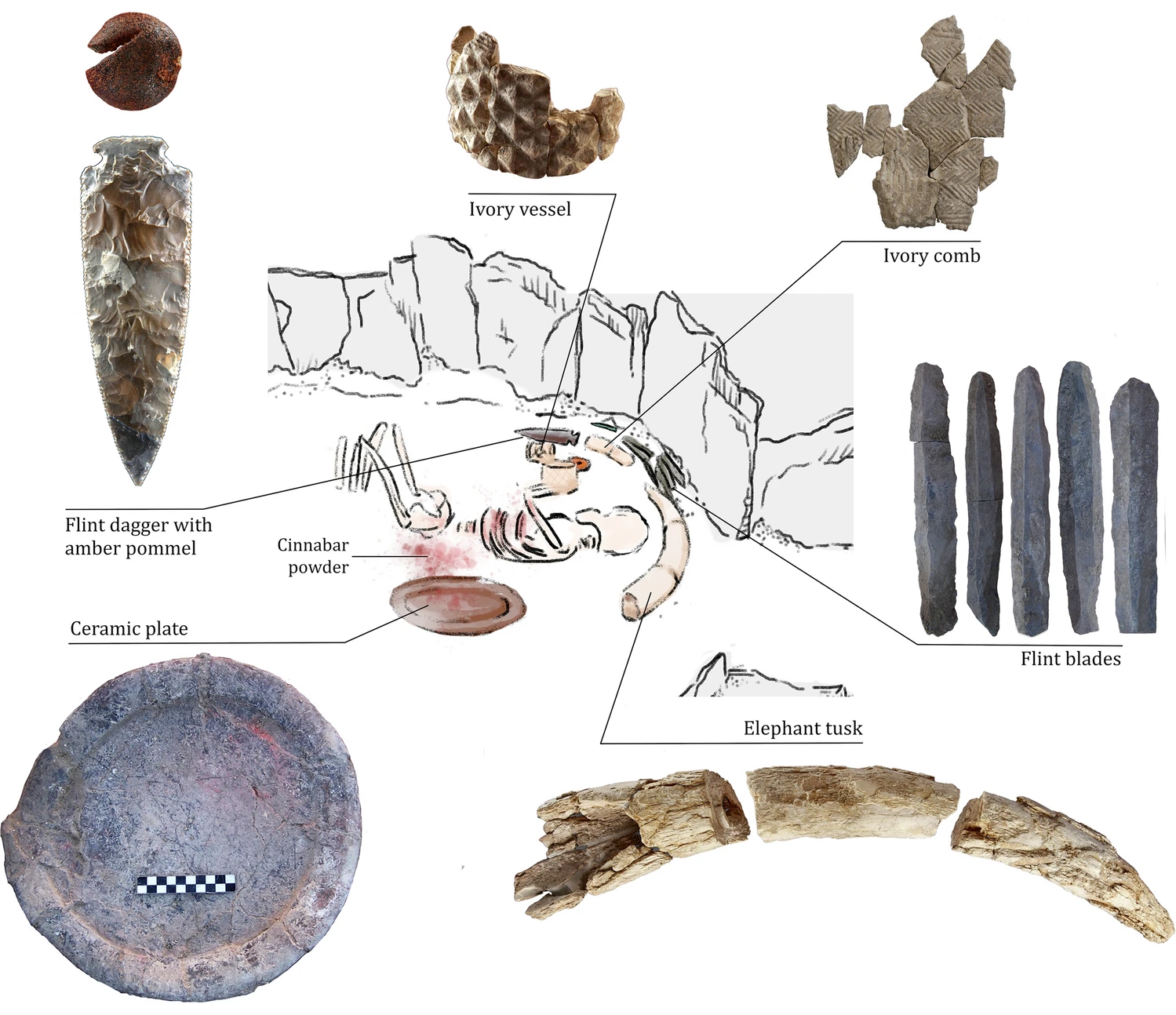
Individual buried in the lower level of the structure 10.049, and main artefacts deposited around the body

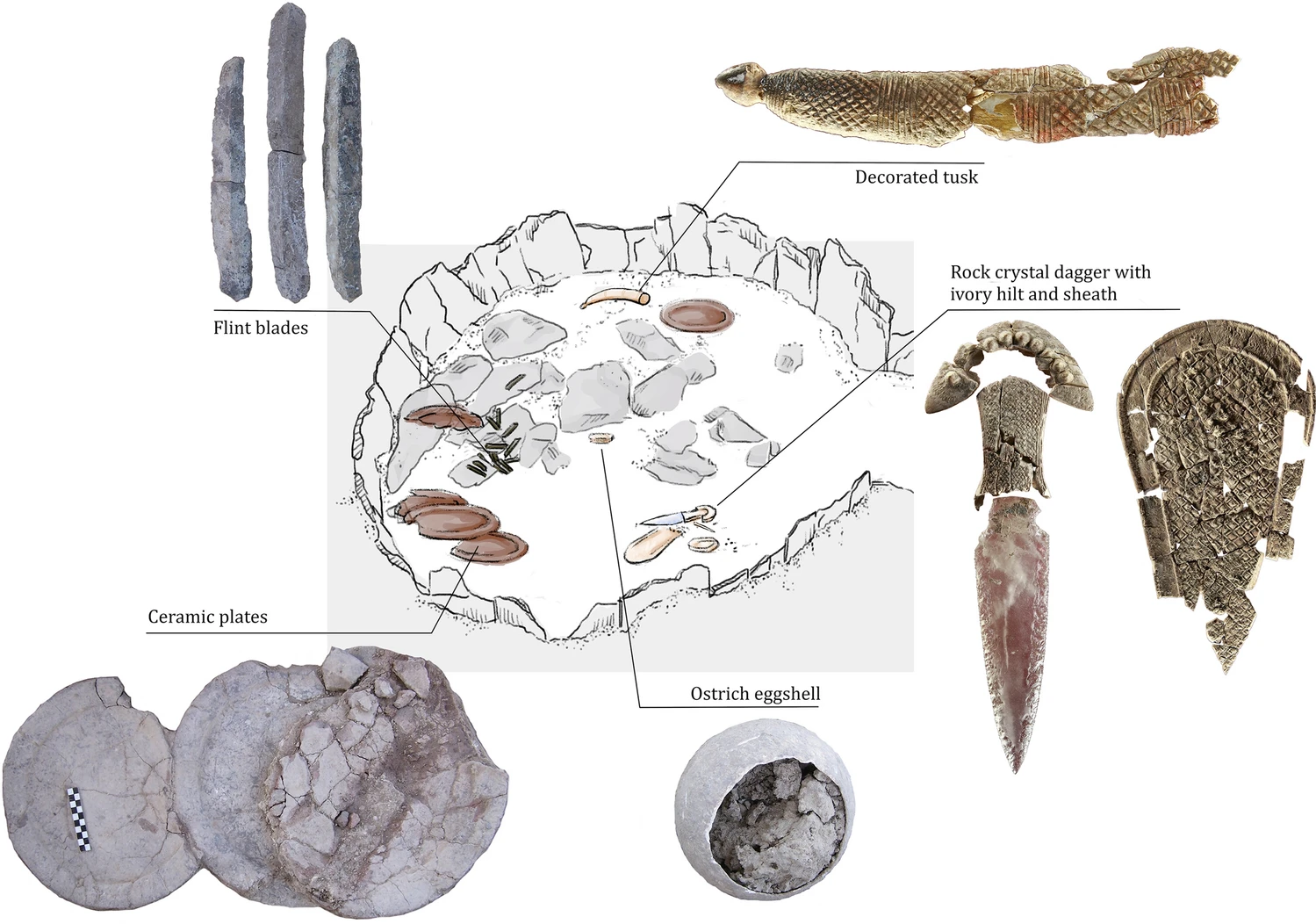
Upper level of structure 10.049, and main artefacts included in the offering

== See also ==
- Prehistoric Iberia - Chalcolithic
- Tholos de El Romeral
