= Roman ruins of Quinta da Abicada =

Ruined villa in Portugal

Roman Ruins of Quinta da Abicada
- Villa Romana de Abicada (Spanish)
- Abicada
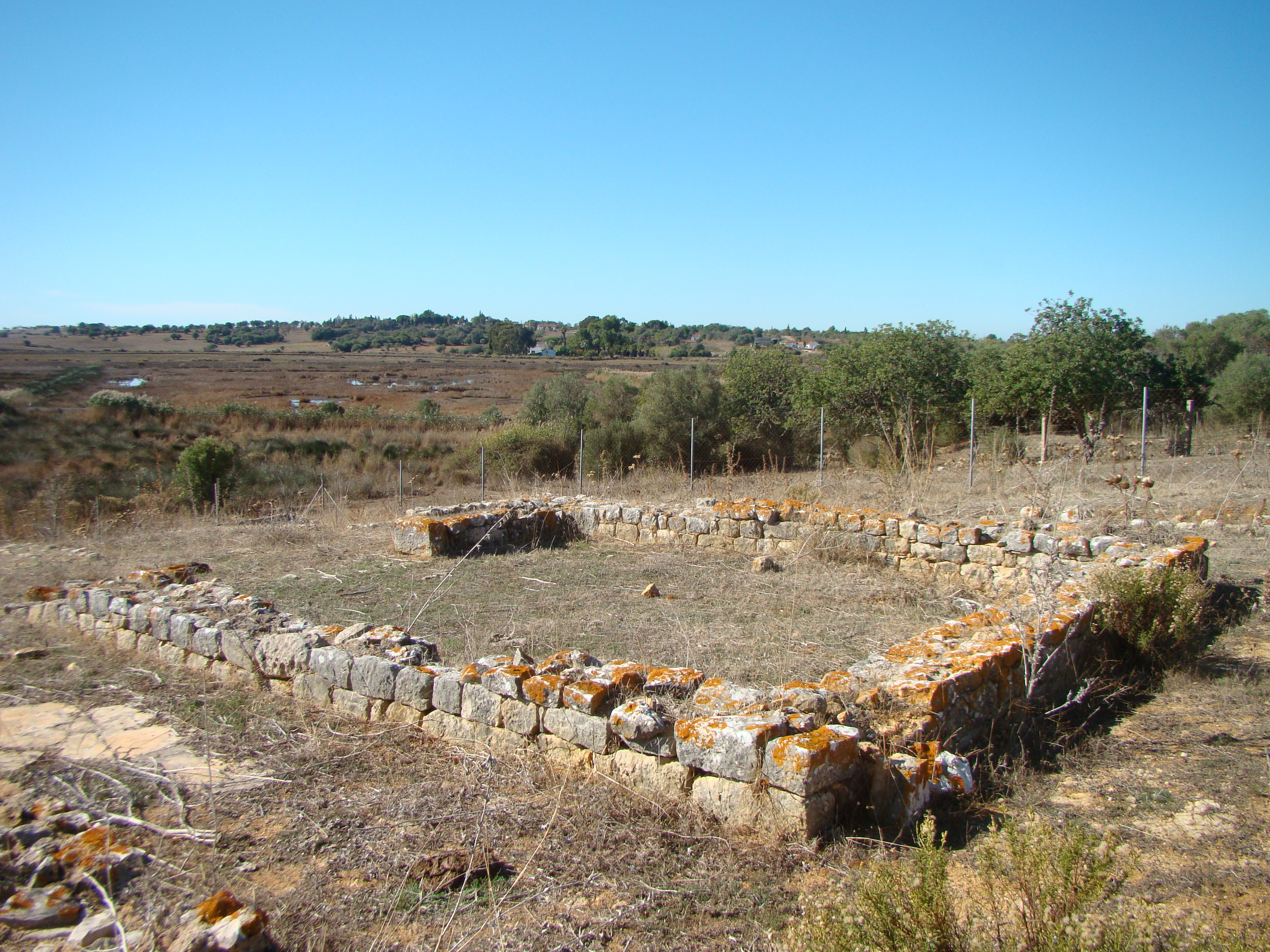
- Estação romana da Quinta da Abicada

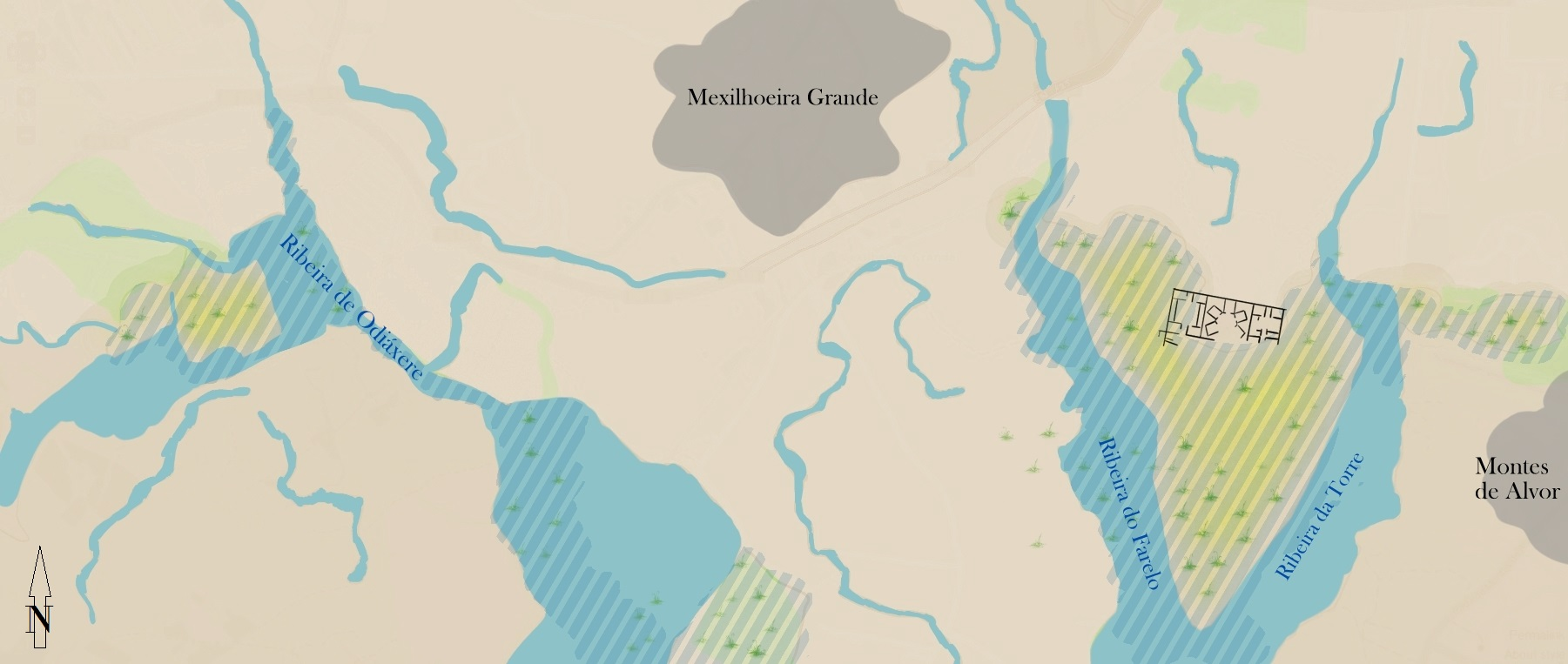

- Abicada
- 37°9′4.738″N 8°35′48.661″W
- Type: settlement
- Periods: Classical antiquity
- Cultures: Roman
- Location: Alvor, Portimão, Faro, Algarve, Portugal
- Region: Lusitania

History
- Built: 1st century AD
- Abandoned: 5th century AD

Abicada (Villa Romana de Abicada or Estação romana da Quinta da Abicada) is the name of Roman ruins in Mexilhoeira Grande, to the north of the civil parish of Alvor, municipality of Portimão, in Algarve region, Portugal. In Roman times it was in the colony of Ipses, in the Roman province of Lusitania, which was authorized to mint currency, and where a woman named Pompeia Exoce looked after the burial of her grandson. Portimão, to east-southeast, known as Portus Magnus at the time, was an important Roman commercial port when the Roman villa was built.

The complex is located on a south-facing promontory spur located between Mexilhoeira Grande and Alvor. The spur lies about eight meters above sea level and is surrounded by the rivers Ribeira do Farelo and Ribeira de Senhora do Verde (Ribeira da Torre), which flow into the Ria de Alvor immediately south. The building, classified as a villa maritima, is characterized by its sophisticated architecture with two peristyles – one hexagonal and the other square-shaped. The villa contained well-preserved geometrically shaped polychrome mosaics (now in the museum of Portimão) and is believed to date from the 4th century AD. The hill itself was inhabited from the 1st to the 5th century AD and has supplied Roman artifacts from the 1st century to the 2nd century.

== The villa and its wealth ==
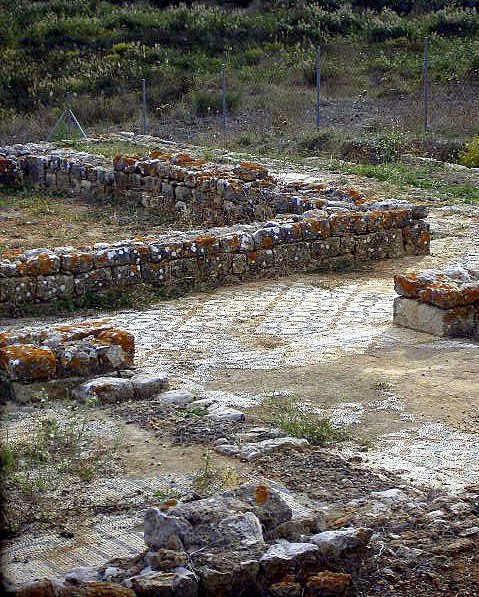
The mosaics (visible here) that decorated the floor are no longer present at the location, and were likely taken to a museum.

The protected site is an agricultural facility called a villa rustica. It consists of a large palatial residence called the villa maritima or pars urbana, and an economic area called the pars rustica. The villa covers an area of approximately 2000 square meters. The building's Mediterranean-style architecture included an attached portico with a view of the lagoon and the sea and exposed inhabitants to the mild climate. Colorful mosaics of floral and geometric compositions covered the floors. Since there was little agricultural area in the direct vicinity, the villa took its wealth from the nearby estuary.

In 1938 the archaeologist José Formosinho Sanches found the remains of the pars rustica including large basins which were used to process offshore seafood twenty meters south of the villa. A pier and dock allowed navigable access to the estuary and the sea. The high density of Post-Tartessos Iron Age sites in the area and the Copper age site of Alcalar indicates a settlement continuity of the indigenous population in the areas used in Roman times. The rich biodiversity of the estuary and lagoons explains this. Fish, shellfish, crabs, and once abundant birds sustained high human populations and in the 4th century allowed large scale commercial exploitation.

== The mosaics ==
Mosaic floors were found in almost all rooms. The mosaics feature tesserae patterns atop a layer of opus caementitium. The mosaics are polychrome and show geometric and floral patterns. Vessels are also depicted. The tesserae of different types of stone are in grey, red, white and blue.

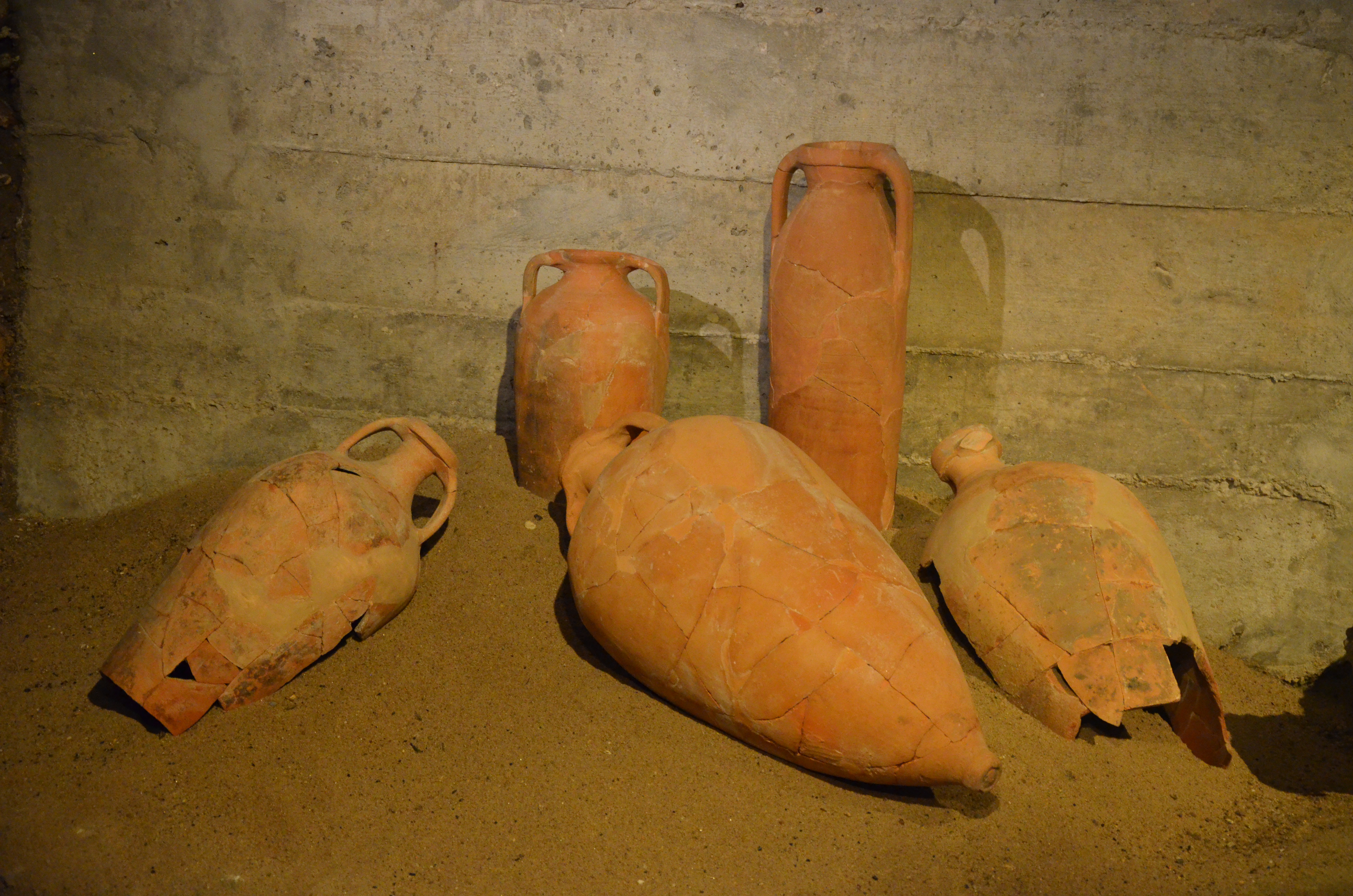
Roman garum factory amphorae

== Artifacts ==
The finds excavated in the 1930s are in the Museu Municipal Dr José Formosinho (English: "Dr José Formosinho Municipal Museum") in Lagos. They consist mainly of metal artifacts such as lead and bronze objects. Due to the lack of stratification, the finds unfortunately do not give a meaningful overview. Later finds include tools of the fishing industry, cosmetics a glass plate with a collar edge (1st century AD) and few pieces of utility ceramics and amphorae dating to the middle imperial period and coins from later settlement phases, including two from the Constantinian period and coinage from the Theodosian period. The findings also included fish sauce garum and fish salting basins (cetariae) bordered with opus caementitium. This allows conclusions to be drawn on the marketing of maritime resources and underpins the classification as villa maritima.

== Protection ==
Villa Romana da Abicada is listed as a National Monument (Monumento Nacional pelo Decreto n.º 35 817, publicado no Diário do Governo, 1.ª série, n.º 187 de 20 de agosto de 1946.)

== See also ==
- Milreu and Roman ruins of Cerro da Vila which are of similar date and scale
- Romanization of Hispania
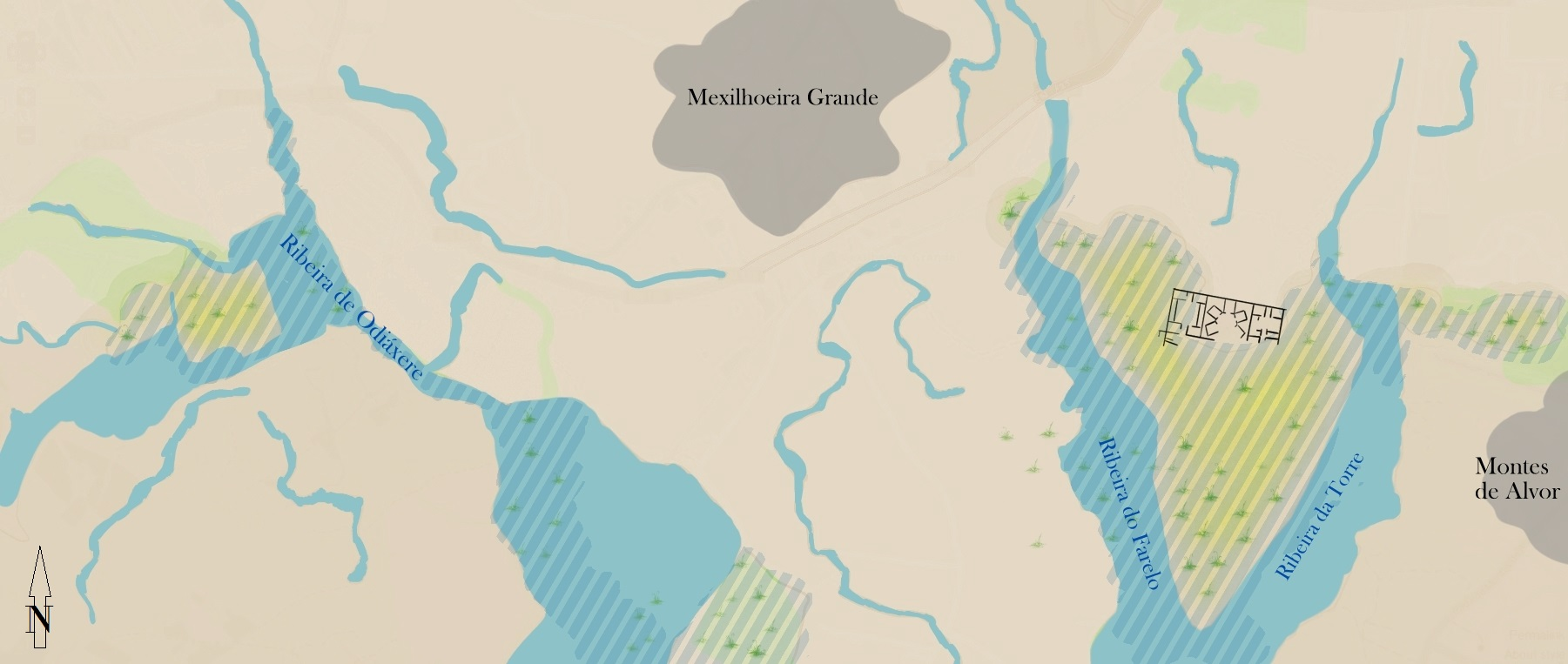
Location of the site

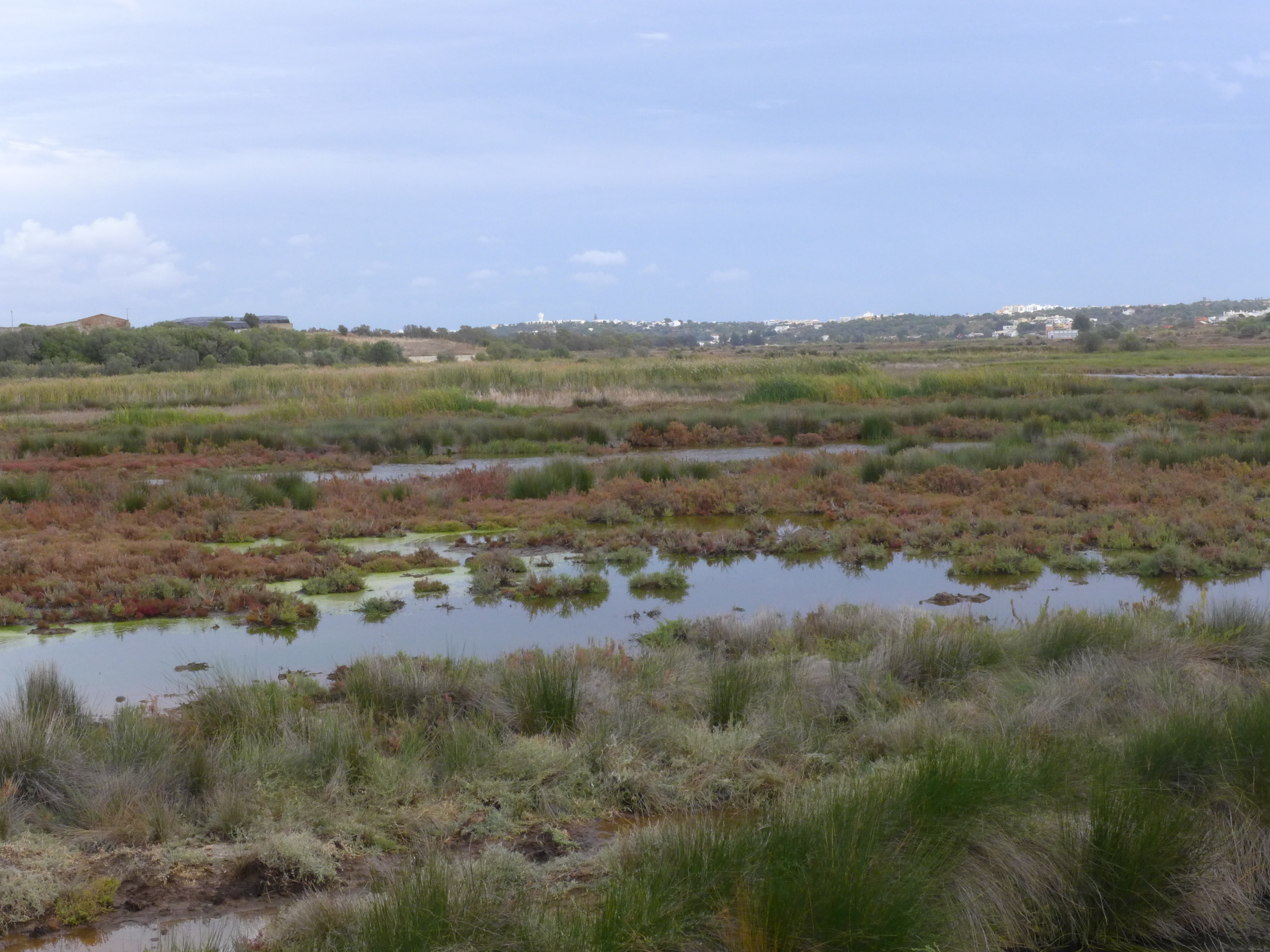
The spur Estação Romana da Quinta da Abicada is near the farm to the far left

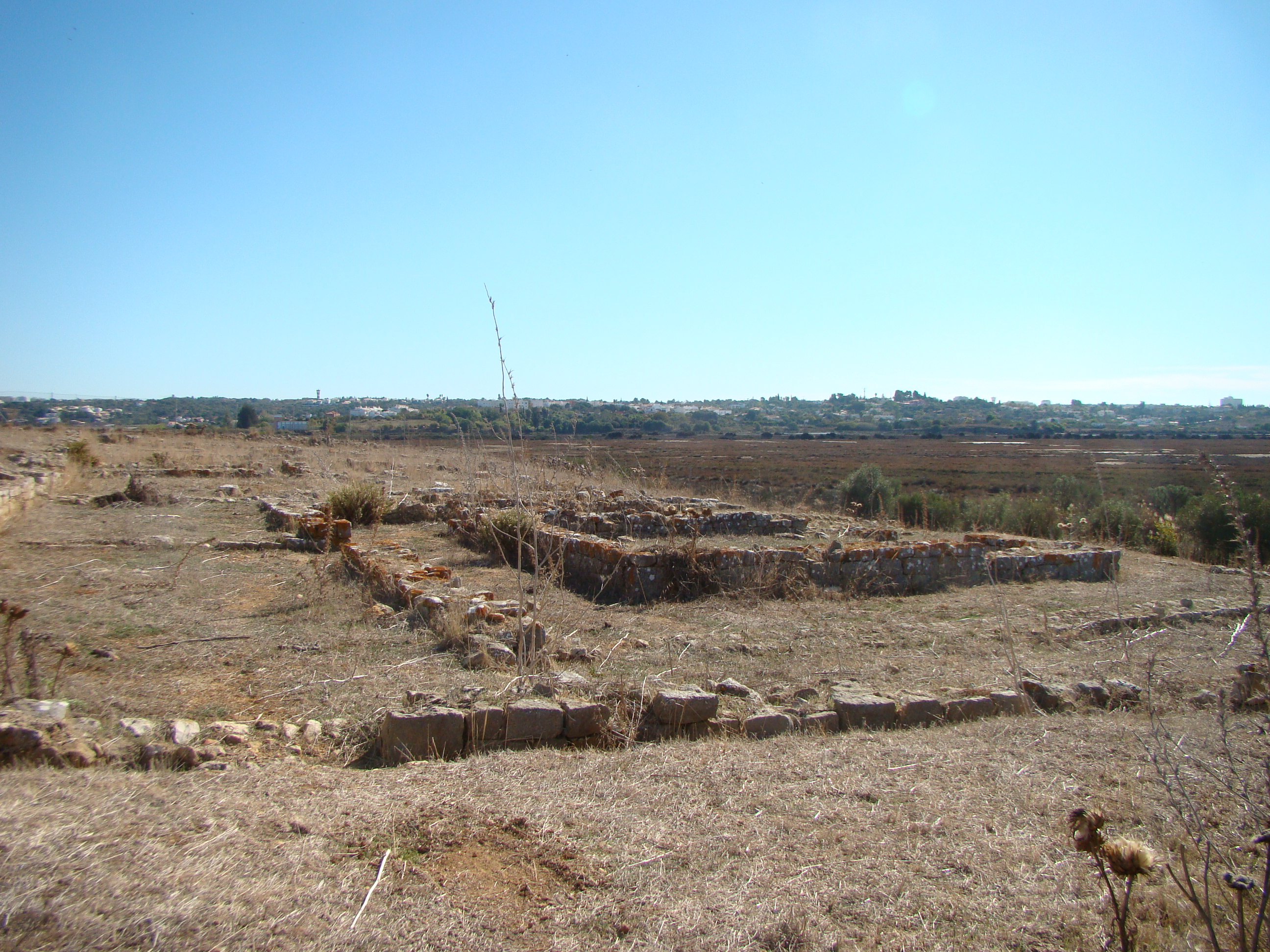
General view of the ruins

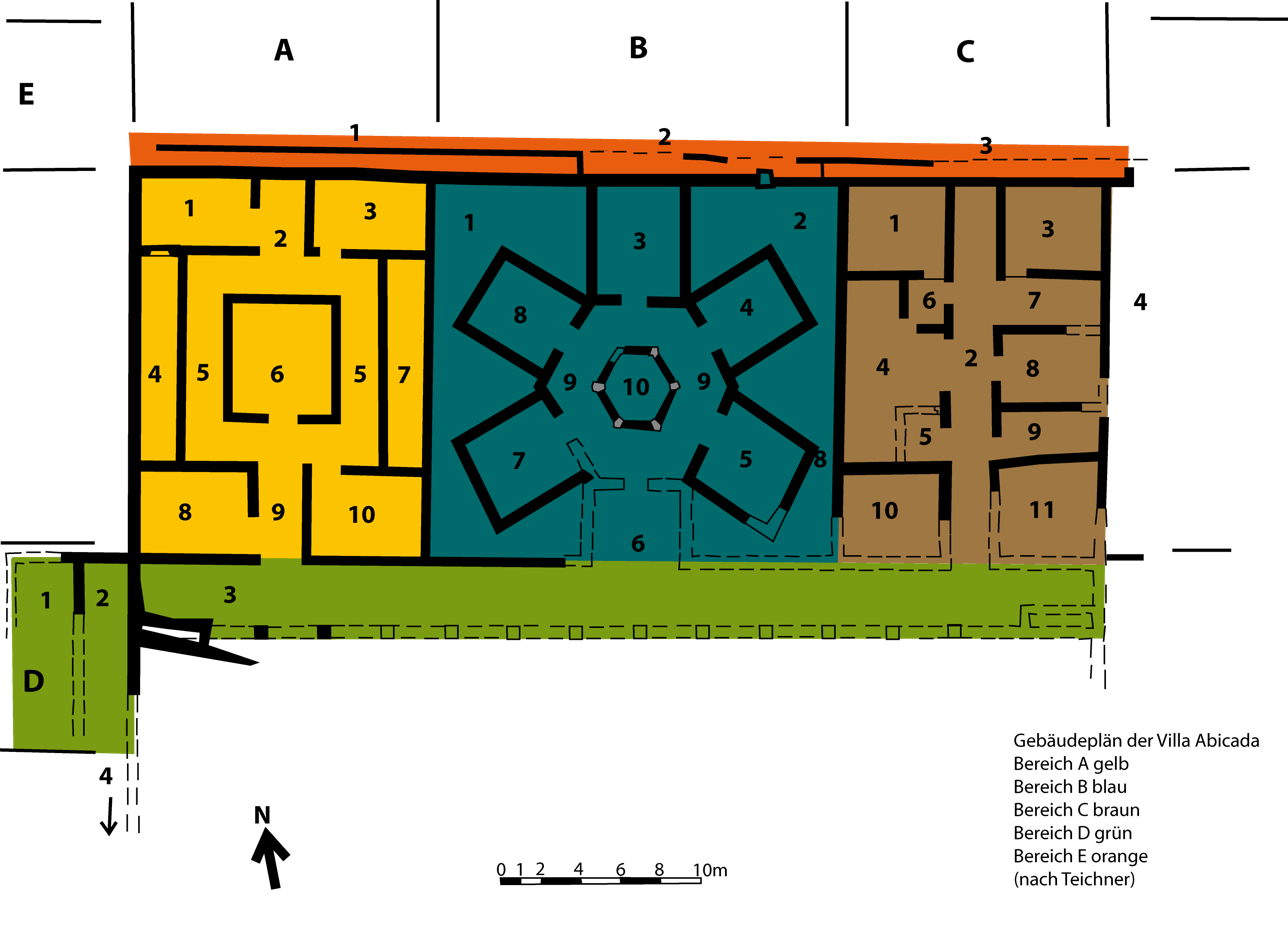
Room plan

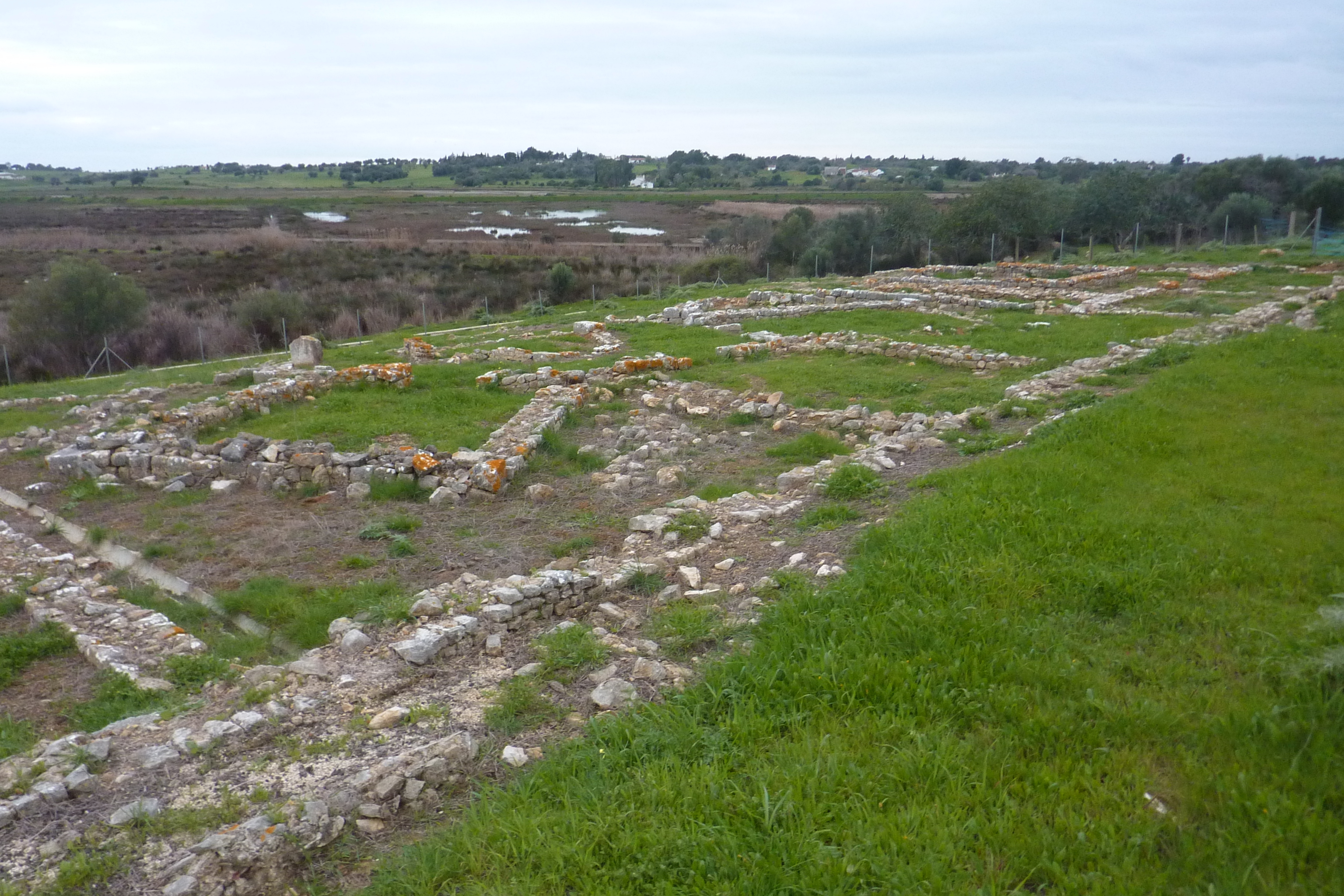
General view from a different angle

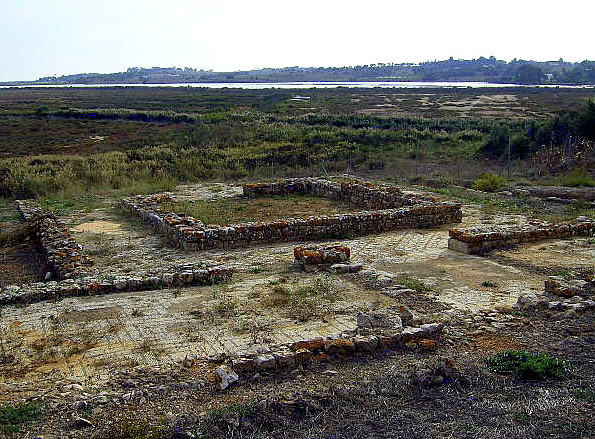
The mosaic floor decorations

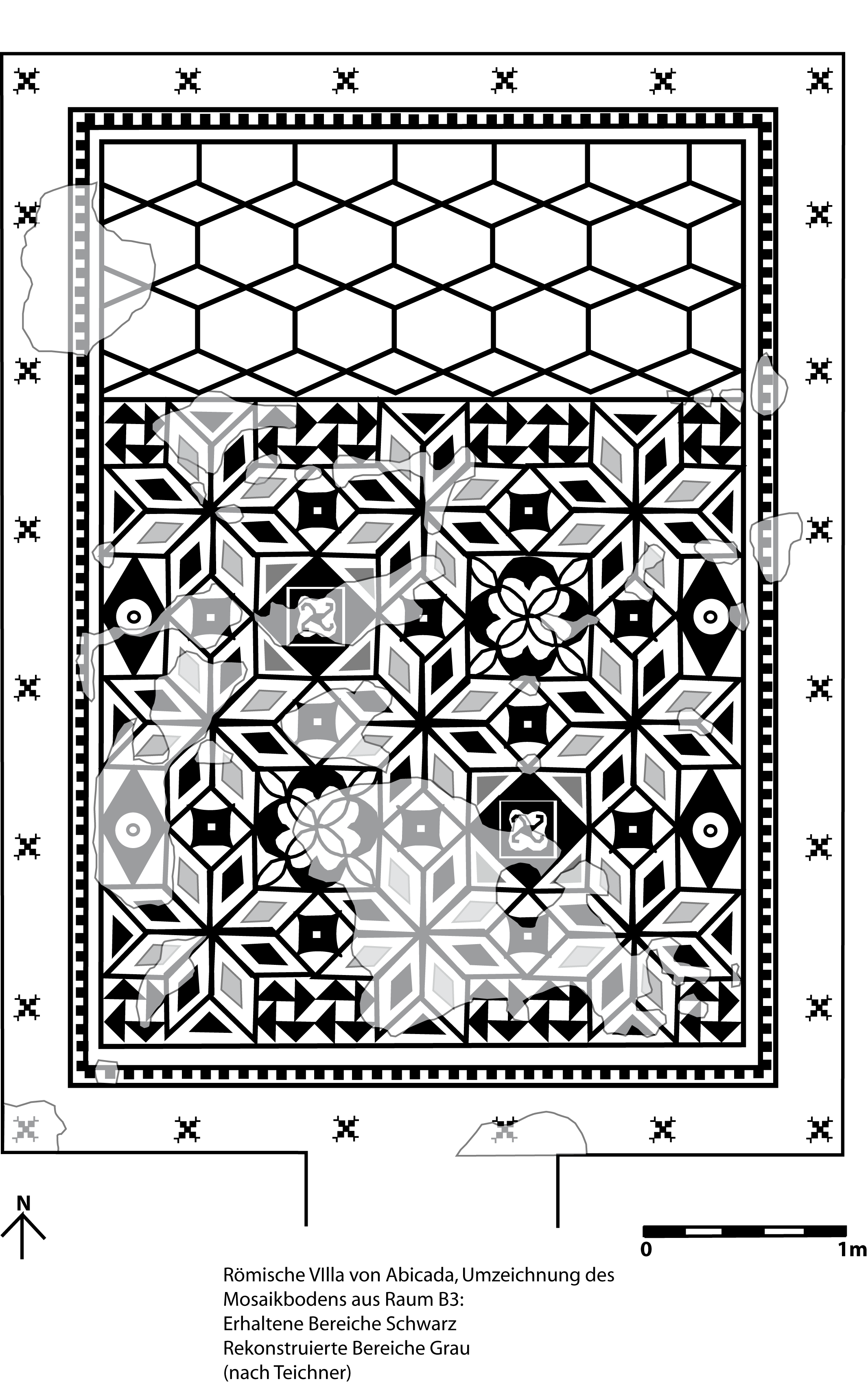
Mosaic

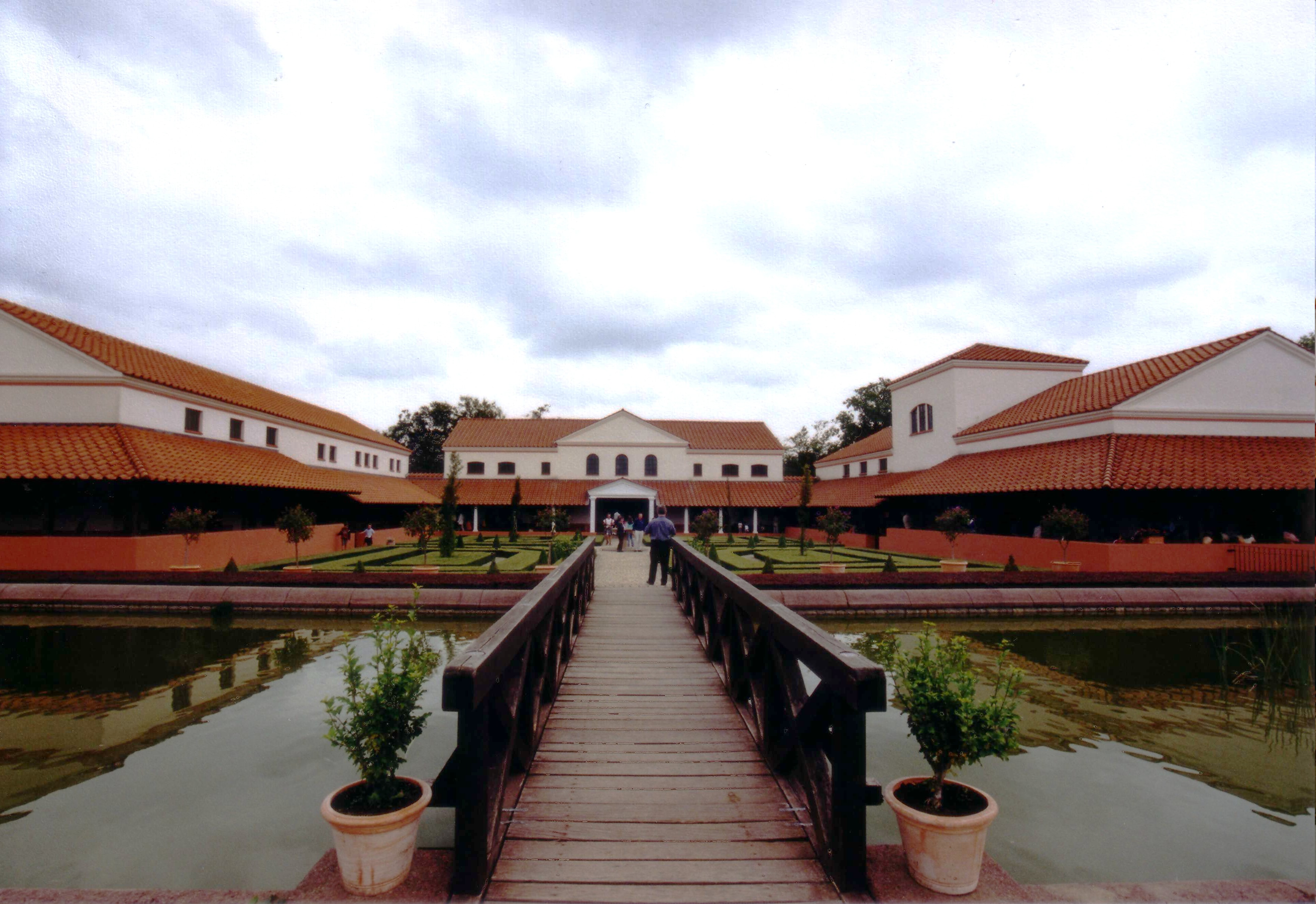
Villa Rustica in Saarland
