= Mexilhoeira Grande =

- Civil parish
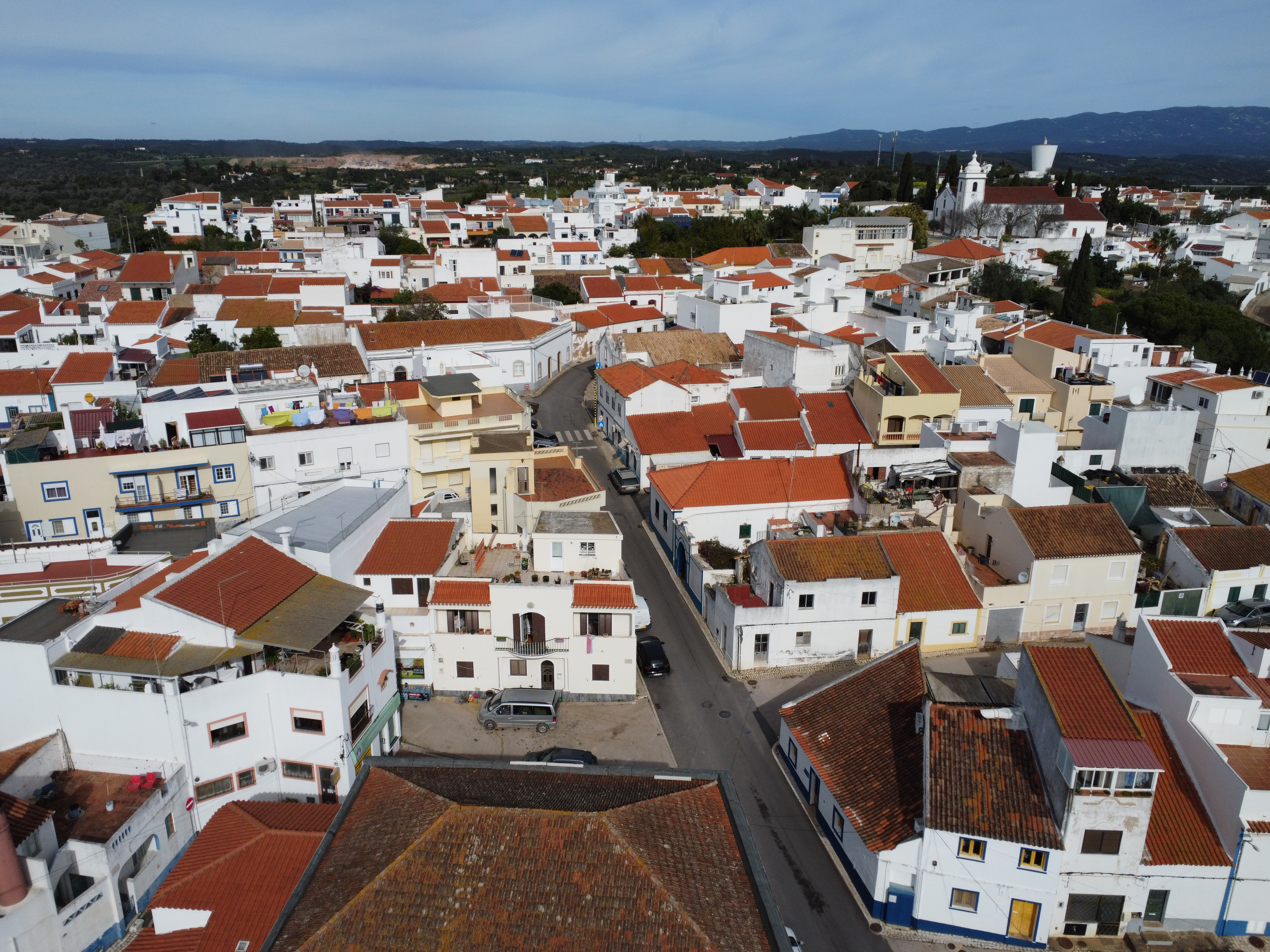
- Aerial view of Mexilhoeira Grande, in 2024

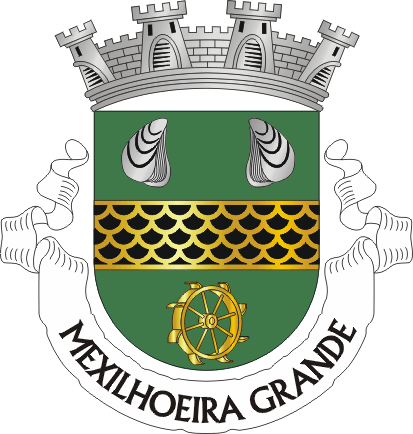
- Coat of arms

- Location in Portugal
- Coordinates: 37.158°N 8.614°W
- Country: Portugal
- Region: Algarve
- Intermunic. comm.: Algarve
- District: Faro
- Municipality: Portimão

Area
  - Total: 91.15 km^{2} (35.19 sq mi)

Population (2011)
  - Total: 4,029
  - Density: 44.20/km^{2} (114.5/sq mi)
- Time zone: UTC+00:00 (WET)
  - Summer (DST): UTC+01:00 (WEST)
- Website: www.freguesiamexigrande.pt

Mexilhoeira Grande (European Portuguese pronunciation: [mɨʃiʎuˈɐjɾɐ ˈɣɾɐ̃dɨ]) is a civil parish in the municipality (concelho) of Portimão in the southern Portuguese region of the Algarve. The population in 2011 was 4,029, in an area of 91.15 km².

== Geography ==
Mexilhoeira Grande is situated in the north of the municipality of Portimão, primarily encompassing rural lands comprising white-painted homes, traditionally agricultural in character.

It is bordered in the north by Monchique, by Portimão in the east, Alvor to the south, and by the parishes of Odiáxere, Bensafrim and Marmelete, in the north and northwest, respectively.

== Economy ==
The region's economy is primarily agricultural-based, although tourism has an important influence on local revenues. The Autódromo Internacional do Algarve, is the natural gateway to the region; situated in an area of plains, approximately 6 kilometres (3.7 mi) to the north of the parish, it is interconnected by variants of the Estrada Nacional EN125.

== Architecture ==
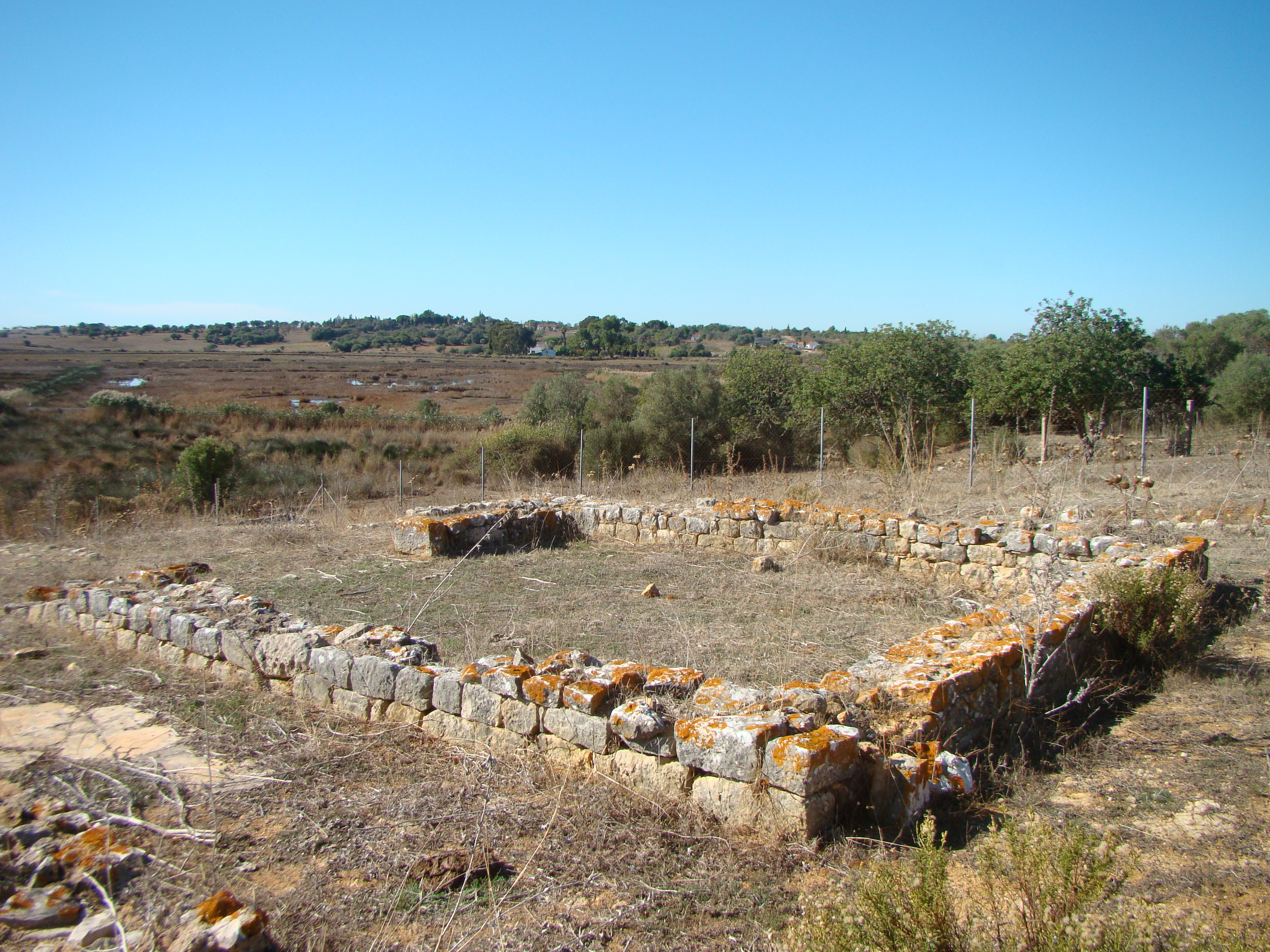
The Roman era ruins of Quinta da Abicada

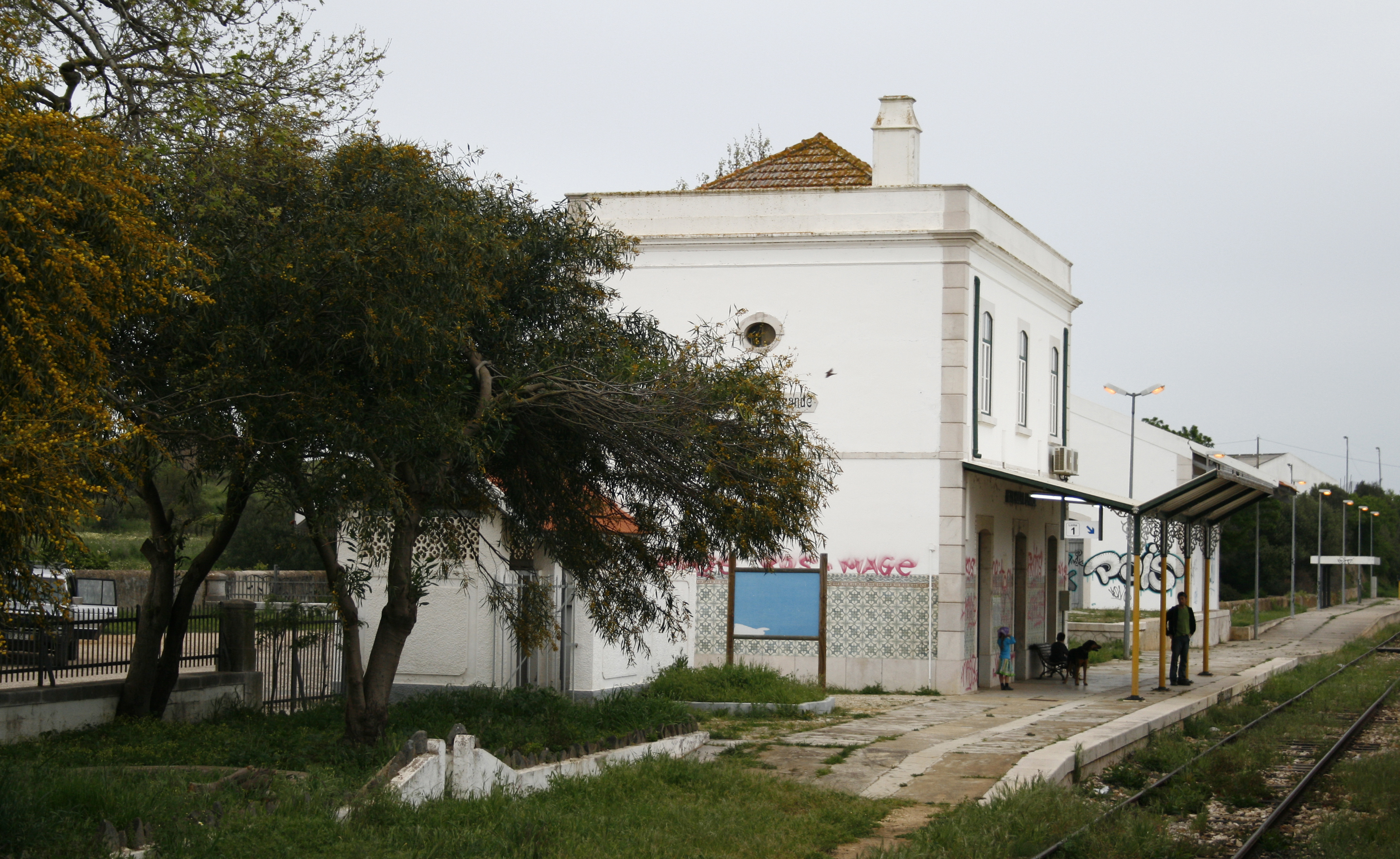
The railway station of Mexilhoeira Grande, used as part of the Algarve Line, until it was converted

=== Prehistoric ===
- Megalithic Monuments of Alcalar (Monumentos de Alcalar/Conjunto Pré-histórico de Alcalar/Povoado Calcolítico de Alcalar/Necrópole Megalítica de Alcalar), likely constructed between in the third millennium BCE and 1600 BCE, at the height of the Calcolithic, consisting of several burial mounds/tombs, that were later acquired by the State, with formal excavations beginning at the end of the 20th century;

=== Archaeological ===
- Roman ruins of Quinta da Abicada (Estação Romana da Quinta da Abicada, from excavations carried out by José Leite de Vasconcelos (1917) and José Formosinho Sanches (1938), it was determined that this Roman centre dates back to the 1st century;

=== Civic ===
- Railway Station of Mexilhoeira Grande (Estação Ferroviária da Mexilhoeira Grande), constructed in the turn-of-the century, the railway station is typical design for the period, but was redesigned to act as the Centro de Interpretação Ambiental da Ria de Alvor (Environmental Interpretative Centre for the Alvor River);

=== Religious ===
- Chapel of Nossa Senhora dos Passos (Capela da Senhora dos Passos/Capela de Nosso Senhor dos Passos) a Baroque-era chapel with Neo-classical lines, the small temple consists of a space with simple vaulted-ceiling, with many 19th century decorations, including tympanium in the principal portico and neoclassical retable;
- Church of Figueira (Igreja da Figueira)
- Church of the Misericórdia (Igreja da Misericórdia), the single-nave 15th-century church, was founded after the establishment of the Misericórdia, the local benevolent and social society;
- Church of Nossa Senhora da Assunção (Igreja Paroquial de Mexilhoeira Grande/Igreja de Nossa Senhora da Assunção), the parochial church of Mexilhoeira Grande, this church is recognized for its Manueline, Renaissance and Baroque elements, that include an interior of three naves, separated by arches, it tower and triumphal archways and main Renaissance-era portico and northern arched apse chapel;
- Church of Nossa Senhora de Verde (Igreja de Nossa Senhora de Verde), constructed in the 15th century, the single nave temple is in considerable ruins, resulting in the closing of the process of classification by the Director of IGESPAR, "not just the state of conservation of the building, but also the fact that it was not possible, actually, classify the structure for municipal use";
