= Megalithic Monuments of Alcalar =

Group of burial tombs in Mexilhoeira Grande, Portugal

- Monumentos Megalíticos de Alcalar
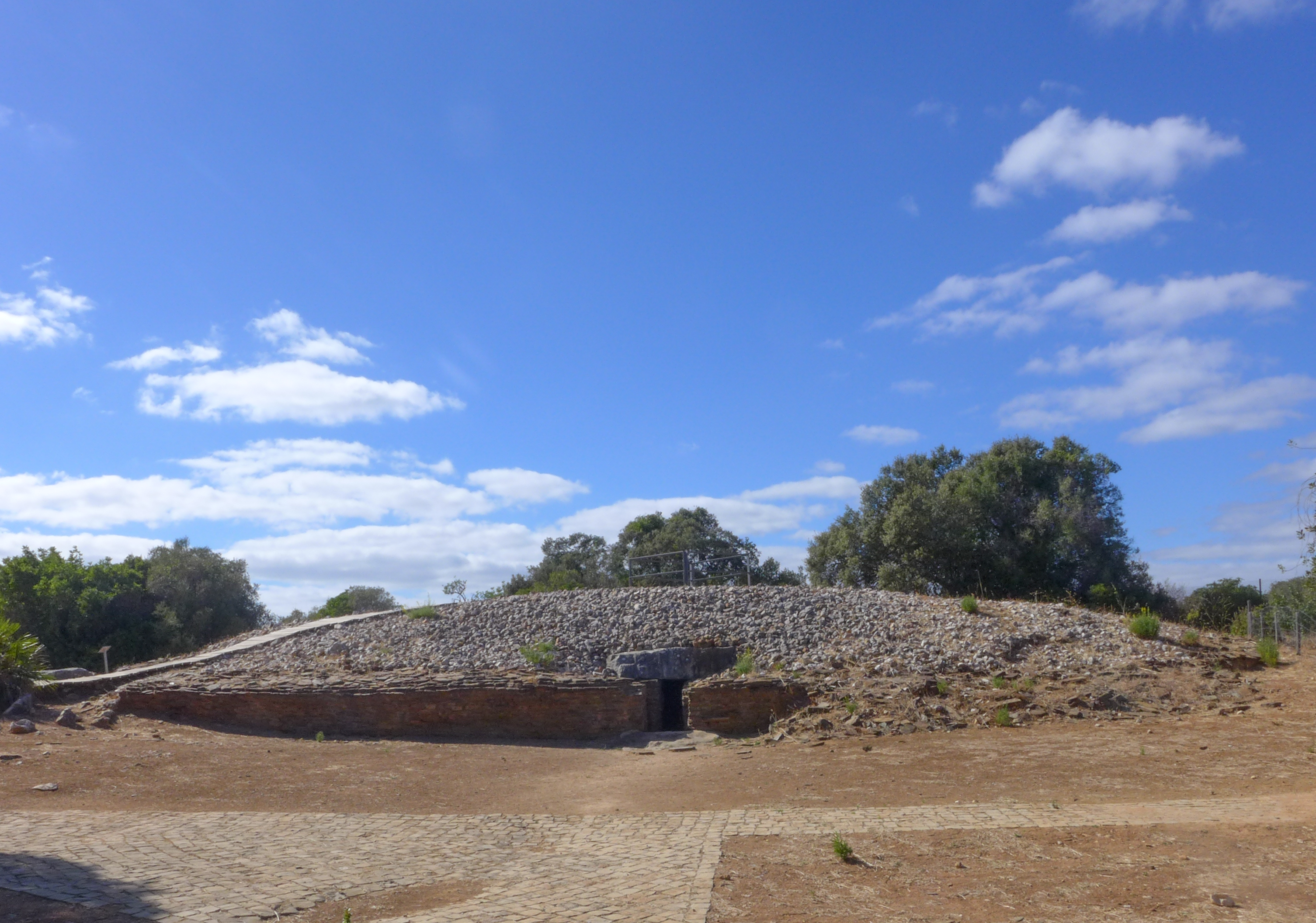

General information
- Type: Necropolis
- Architectural style: Calcolithic
- Location: Mexilhoeira Grande, Portimão, Portugal
- Coordinates: 37°11′56″N 8°35′17″W
- Year built: c. 2500 BC
- Owner: Portugal

Technical details
- Material: Granite

The Megalithic Monuments of Alcalar (Portuguese: Monumentos Megalíticos de Alcalar) are a group of burial tombs that comprise a Calcolithic necropolis, located in the civil parish of Mexilhoeira Grande, municipality of Portimão, Portugal.

== History ==
During the 3rd millennium BC, a 10 hectare stretch of land, located at the end of a once navigable part of the Torre River became the centre of settlement. It was constructed on a hilltop along the Algarve's limestone coastal strip, in what became known as the settlement of Alcalar, approximately 5 kilometres (3.1 mi) from Mexilhoeira Grande.

Around 18 different megalithic tombs were constructed in the surrounding hills, forming a necropolis using various building techniques over time.

In 1975, the State partially acquired Tholos 7. The following year, a fence was constructed to protect the site.

In 1982, the State acquired the rural house called Courela das Minas and completed repairs to the fencing around the site.

During the 1990s, excavation of the monument and limestone sub-soils of Monte de Canelas was undertaken, resulting in the discovery that the space was used as ossuary, where various rituals were completed, mostly in the deceased buried in the fetal position. These investigations culminated in the 8 April 1997 dispatch, enlarging the area of protection by the Vice-presidency of the IPPAR.

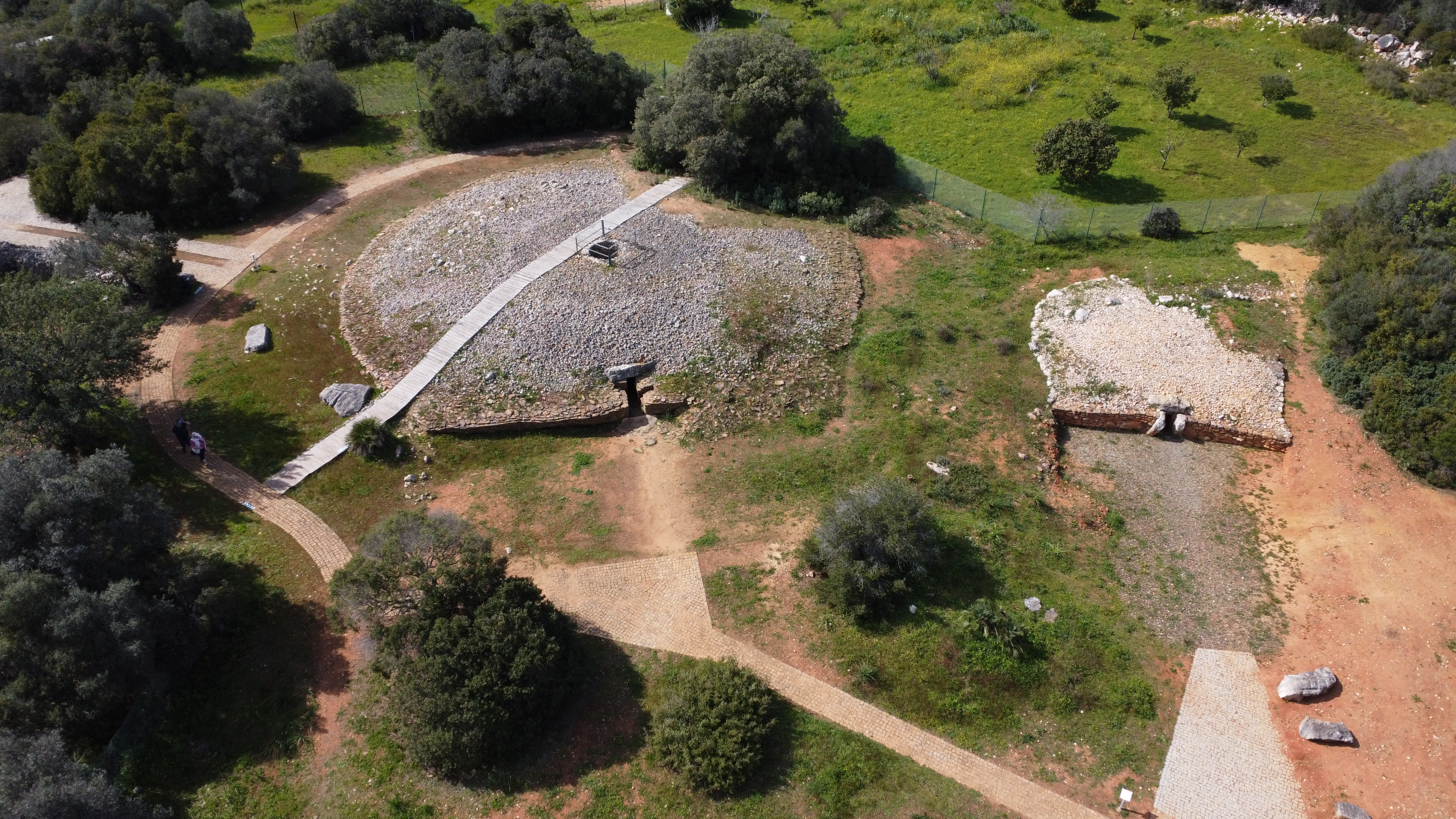
Aerial view of the Megalithic Monuments of Alcalar

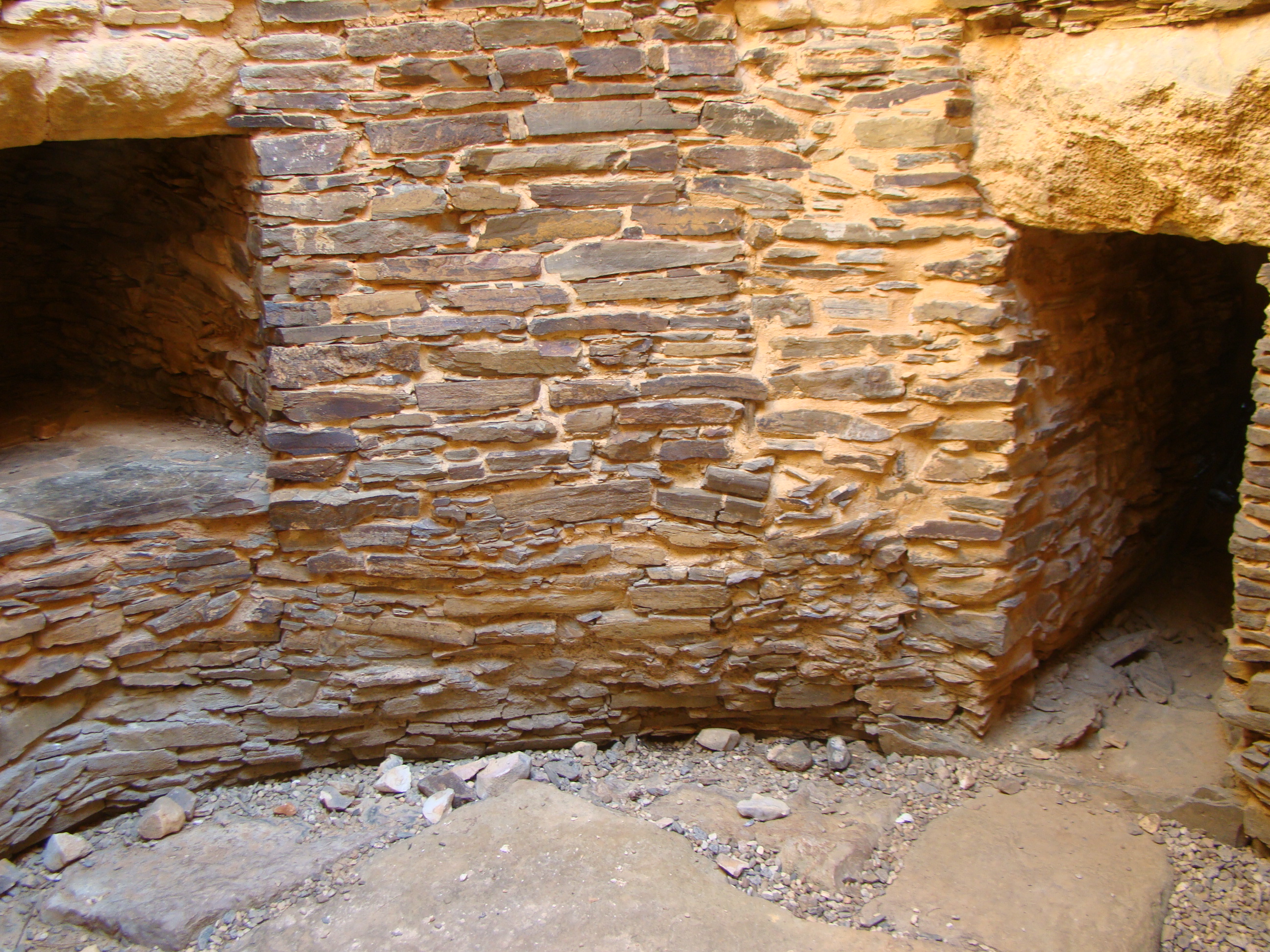
Interior of one of the tombs

On 23 October 1998, under the auspices of the Programa de Salvaguarda e Valorização do Conjunto Pré-histórico de Alcalar (Program for the Safeguarding and Valorization of the Pre-historic monuments of Alcalar), Dispatch 18 364/98, (published in the Diário da República, Series 2, 245), the State proceeded to expropriate the rural buildings in the centre of the civil parish of Mexilhoeira Grande (under article 160, secção J). This was followed on 7 May 1999, under the same program, under Dispatch 9109/99 (published in the Diário da República, Serie 2, 106), the acquisition of the rural house Courela das Minas, under article 161, section J, for an interpretative centre, designed by João Santa-Rita. In 1998, the IPPAR was involved in work to restore the burial mound, providing access to the gallery of Tholos 7, recomposition of the megaliths, drainage of the spaces and adequate protection, which further involved the a geotectonic study of the site.

In October 2000, the Centro de Acolhimento e Interpretação dos Monumentos (Interpretative and Study Centre), constructed by the IPPAR, under the Programa de Salvaguarda e Valorização do Conjunto Pré-histórico de Alcalar was inaugurated to the public.

On 25 August 2008, the DRCAlgarve, proposed the extension of the zone of protection for the monuments. This was supported, on 3 March 2009, by the consultative council of IGESPAR to the enlargement of the classification zone.

The Interpretative Centre was transferred, on 1 March 2012, from the management of the Direção Regional de Cultura do Algarve (DCRAlg) to a partnership with the municipal government of Portimão, becoming a nucleus of the local museum: it was, therefore, closed on for construction and rehabilitation. Both entities were involved in a public works to benefit the tourist-viability of the site between 1–24 March 2012; archaeological excavations were extended to also consolidate the monuments, in particular Tholos 7, and geophysical analysis of monument 15.

== Architecture ==
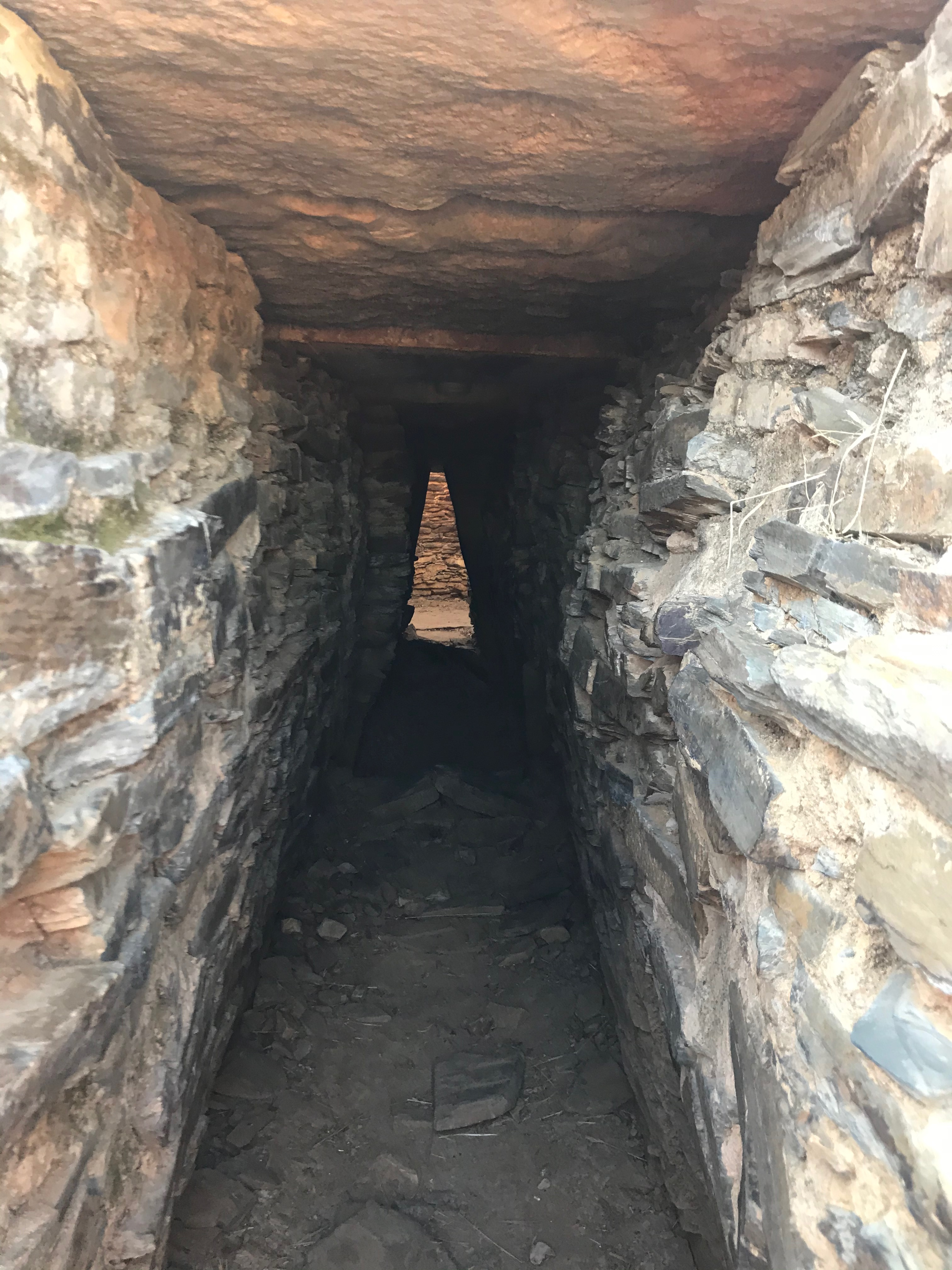
Entrance passage to megalithic tomb at Alcalar

The site is located on a hilltop, with natural conditions that permit its defence.

The area is populated by a necropolis of various rectangular burial mounds and tholos (with chambers and corridors). Some include false copulas and lateral niches, with several architectural techniques employed in their construction.

Due to its monumental character, Tholos 7 (which was built in the third millennium) constitutes an undeniable histo-cultural and scientific centre of the site, including its quantity of artifacts unearthed. The cairn beehive tomb, is built from a mound of stones around a tholos, with an underlying corridor and vaulted chamber (or crypt). Its base consists of schist and is duplicated in a wall the surrounds the structure, forming a pathway. Its diameter is 27 metres (89 ft), with an east-facing entrance-way located in the middle. Access to the main chamber is through the eastward-facing corridor, covered in large slabs of limestone that oriented to narrowly focus access to the crypt. This space is covered by a slab of limestone, and lies in the geometrical center of the tomb.

== Gallery ==
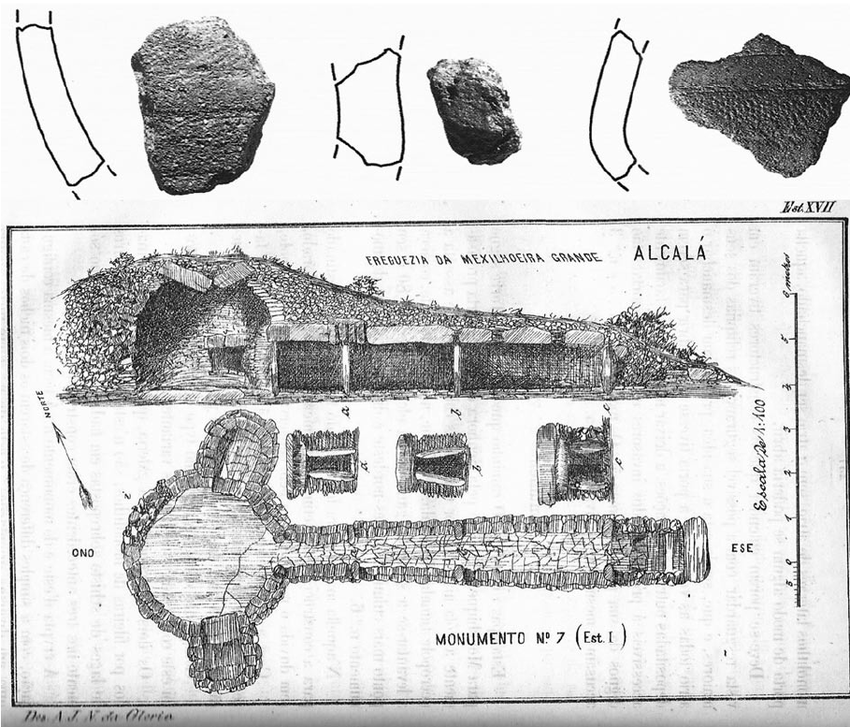
Plan of Tholos 7

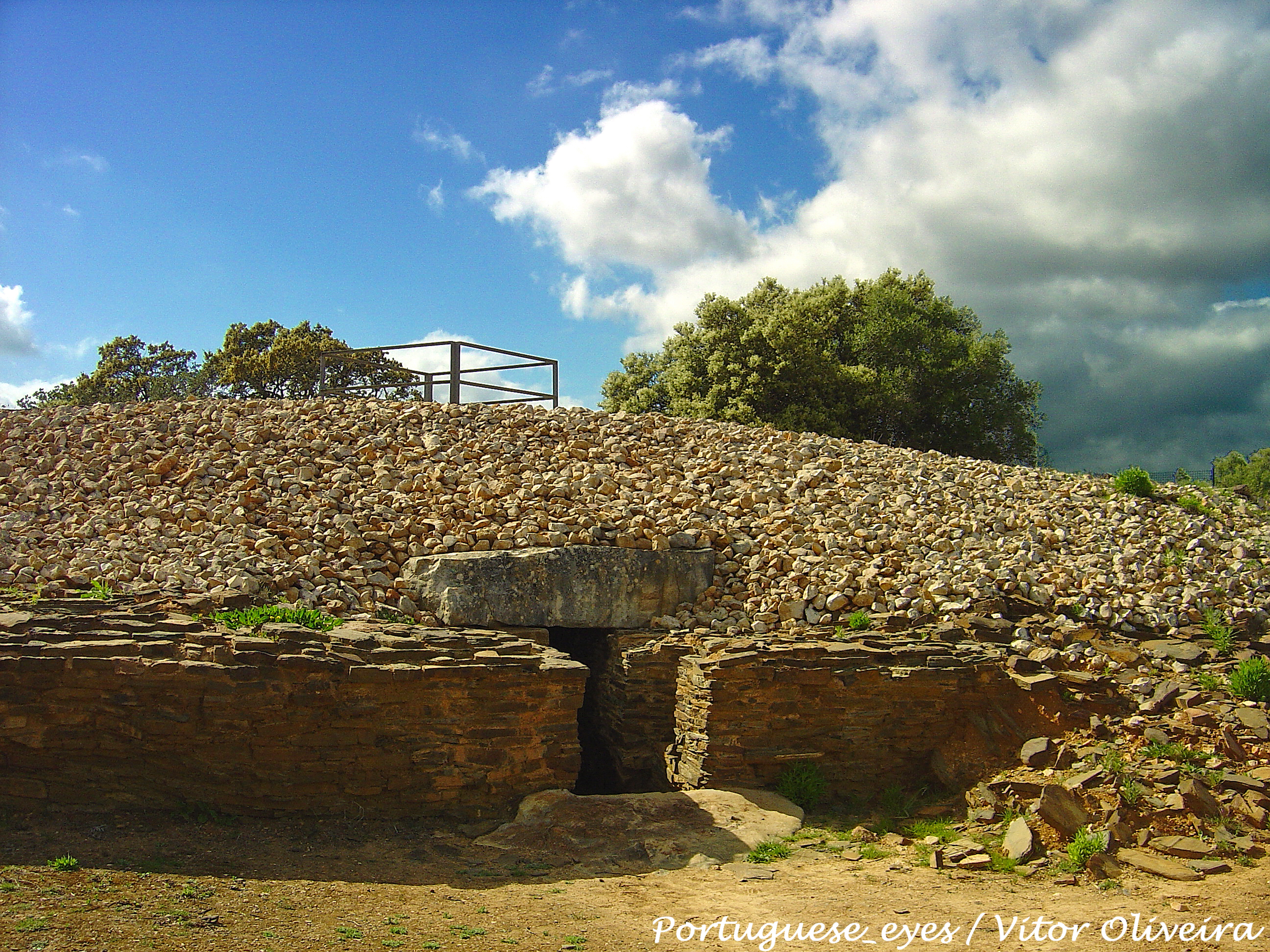
Tholos 7

== See also ==
- Prehistoric Iberia
- Tholos de El Romeral
- Valencina de la Concepción
- Los Millares
- Dolmen of Menga
- Dolmen de Viera
- Antequera Dolmens Site
