= Bell Beaker culture =

European archaeological culture, 2800–1800 BCE

- Simplified map of the Bell Beaker Culture and its subgroups.
- Geographical range: Europe and Northwest Africa
- Period: Chalcolithic – Early Bronze Age
- Dates: c. 2800–1800 BCE; 2600-2200 BCE (Central Europe); 2450-1800 BCE (Britain)
- Major sites: Castro of Zambujal, Castro of Vila Nova de São Pedro, Los Millares, Ciempozuelos, Valencina de la Concepción, Amesbury, Kirkhaugh cairns, Newgrange, Ross Island, Killarney, Molenaarsgraaf, Oostwoud, Le Petit-Chasseur, Saint-Martin-de-Corléans Megalithic Area, Pömmelte, Kromsdorf, Irlbach, Hoštice-Heroltice, Budakalász, Csepel
- Preceded by: Corded Ware culture, Single Grave culture, Funnelbeaker culture, Neolithic British Isles, Neolithic Ireland, Neolithic France, Chalcolithic Iberia, Veraza culture, Chalcolithic Italy, Baden culture, Vučedol culture, Horgen culture, Auvernier culture
- Followed by: Únětice culture, Bronze Age Britain, Wessex Culture, Nordic Bronze Age, Bronze Age France, Armorican Tumulus culture, Rhône culture, Bronze Age Ireland, Bronze Age Iberia, Argaric culture, Levantine Bronze Age, Pyrenean Bronze, Polada culture, Nuragic culture, Cetina culture, Middle Helladic Greece, Hilversum culture, Elp culture, Nagyrev culture, Mierzanowice culture

The Bell Beaker culture, also known as the Bell Beaker complex or Bell Beaker phenomenon, is an archaeological culture named after the inverted-bell beaker drinking vessel used at the beginning of the European Bronze Age, arising as early as 2800 BCE. The term was first coined as Glockenbecher by German prehistorian Paul Reinecke, and the English translation Bell Beaker was introduced by John Abercromby in 1904.

Bell Beaker culture lasted up to c. 1650 BCE in some areas, and disappeared as early as 2300 BCE at others, varying dates depending on the region. In Britain, it lasted from c. 2450 BCE, with the appearance of single burial graves, until as late as 1800 BCE, but in central Europe only until 2300 BCE, when it was succeeded by the Únětice culture. The culture was widely dispersed throughout Western Europe, being present in many regions of Iberia and stretching eastward to the Danubian plains, and northward to the islands of Great Britain and Ireland, and was also present in the islands of Sardinia and Sicily and some coastal areas in north-western Africa. The Bell Beaker phenomenon shows substantial regional variation, and a study from 2018 found that it was associated with genetically diverse populations.

In its early phase, the Bell Beaker culture can be seen as the western contemporary of the Corded Ware culture of Central Europe. From about 2400 BCE the Beaker folk culture expanded eastwards, into the Corded Ware horizon. In parts of Central and Eastern Europe, as far east as Poland, a sequence occurs from Corded Ware to Bell Beaker. This period marks a period of cultural contact in Atlantic and Western Europe following a prolonged period of relative isolation during the Neolithic.

In its mature phase, the Bell Beaker culture is understood as not only a collection of characteristic artefact types, but a complex cultural phenomenon involving metalwork in copper, arsenical bronze and gold, long-distance exchange networks, archery, specific types of ornamentation, and (presumably) shared ideological, cultural and religious ideas, as well as social stratification and the emergence of regional elites. A wide range of regional diversity persists within the widespread late Beaker culture, particularly in local burial styles (including incidences of cremation rather than burial), housing styles, economic profile, and local ceramic wares (Begleitkeramik). Nonetheless, according to Lemercier (2018) the mature phase of the Beaker culture represents "the appearance of a kind of Bell Beaker civilization of continental scale".

== Origins and expansion ==
=== Origins ===
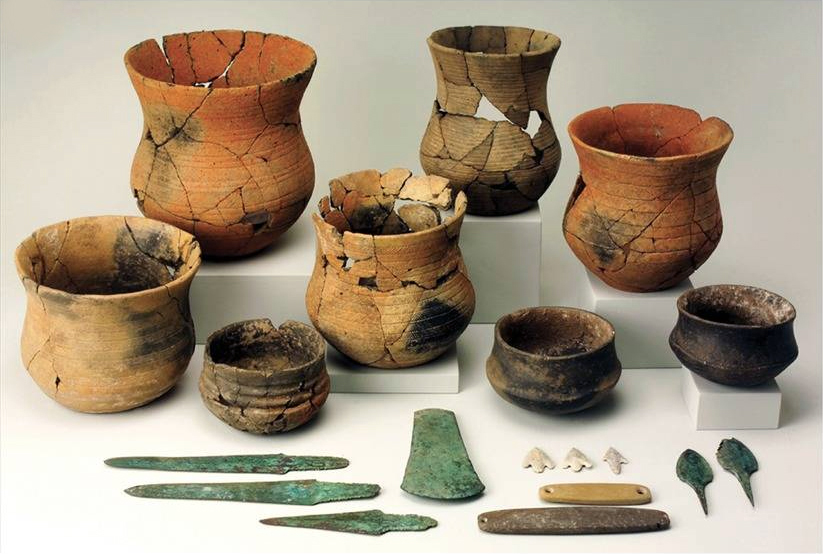
Bell Beaker artefacts from Spain: ceramics, metal daggers, axe and javelin points, stone wristguards and arrowheads

The Bell Beaker artefacts (at least in their early phase) are not distributed across a contiguous area, as is usual for archaeological cultures, but are found in insular concentrations scattered across Europe. Their presence is not associated with a characteristic type of architecture or of burial customs. However, the Bell Beaker culture does appear to coalesce into a coherent archaeological culture in its later phase.

The origin of the "Bell Beaker" artefacts has been traced to the early 3rd millennium BCE, with early examples of the "maritime" Bell Beaker design having been found at the Tagus estuary in Portugal, radiocarbon dated to c. 28th century BCE. The inspiration for the Maritime Bell Beaker is argued to have been the small and earlier Copoz beakers that have impressed decoration and which are found widely around the Tagus estuary in Portugal. Turek sees Late Neolithic precursors in northern Africa, arguing the Maritime style emerged as a result of seaborne contacts between Iberia and Morocco in the first half of the third millennium BCE.

More recent analyses of the "Beaker phenomenon", published since the 2000s, have persisted in describing the origin of the "Beaker phenomenon" as arising from a synthesis of elements, representing "an idea and style uniting different regions with different cultural traditions and background".

=== Expansion and Corded Ware contacts ===
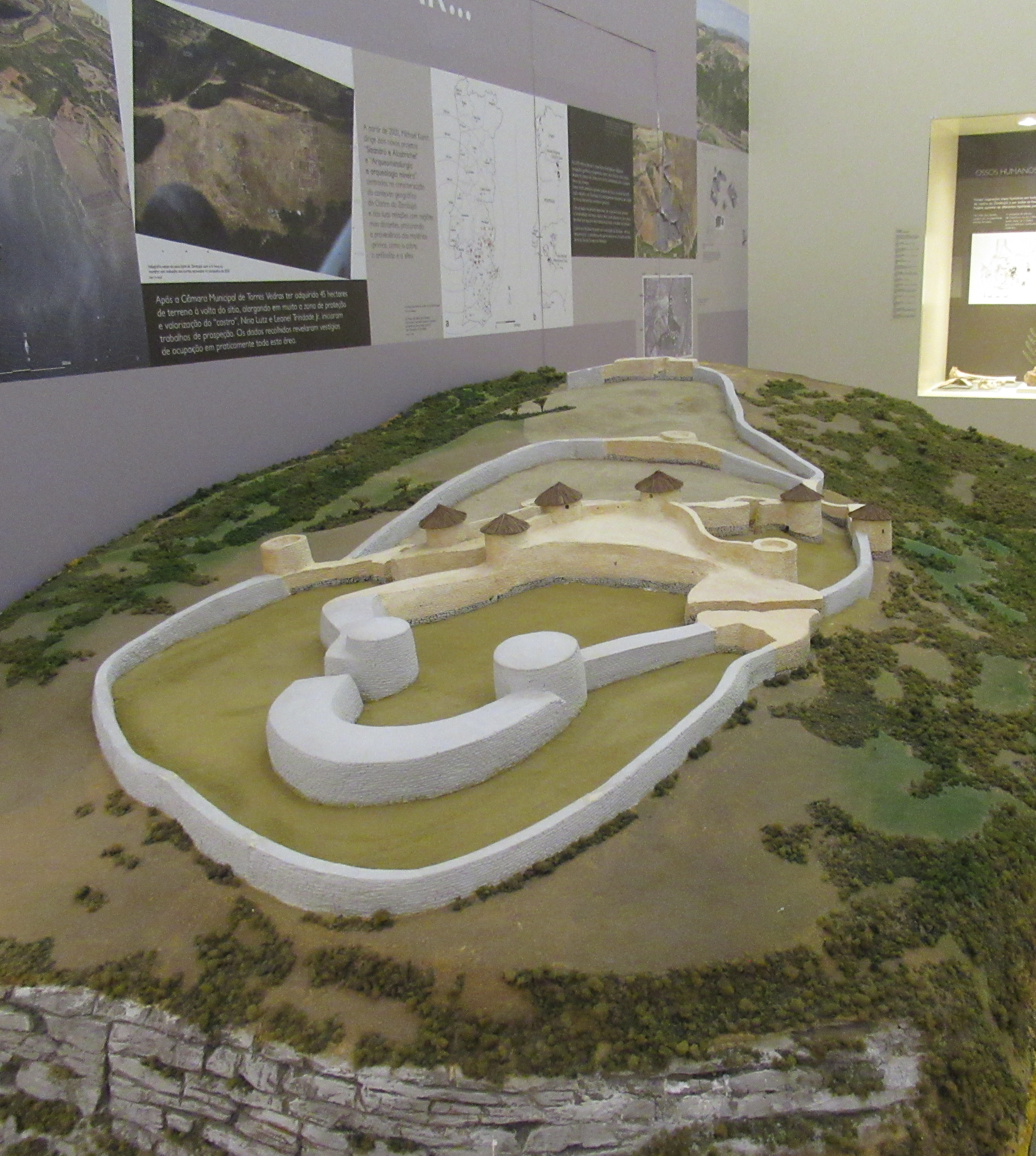
Model of the Castro of Zambujal, Portugal

The initial moves from the Tagus estuary were maritime. A southern move led to the Mediterranean where 'enclaves' were established in south-western Spain and southern France around the Golfe du Lion and into the Po Valley in Italy, probably via ancient western Alpine trade routes used to distribute jadeite axes. A northern move incorporated the southern coast of Armorica. The enclave established in southern Brittany was linked closely to the riverine and landward route, via the Loire, and across the Gâtinais Valley to the Seine Valley, and thence to the lower Rhine. This was a long-established route reflected in early stone axe distributions, and via this network, Maritime Bell Beakers first reached the Lower Rhine in c. 2600 BCE.

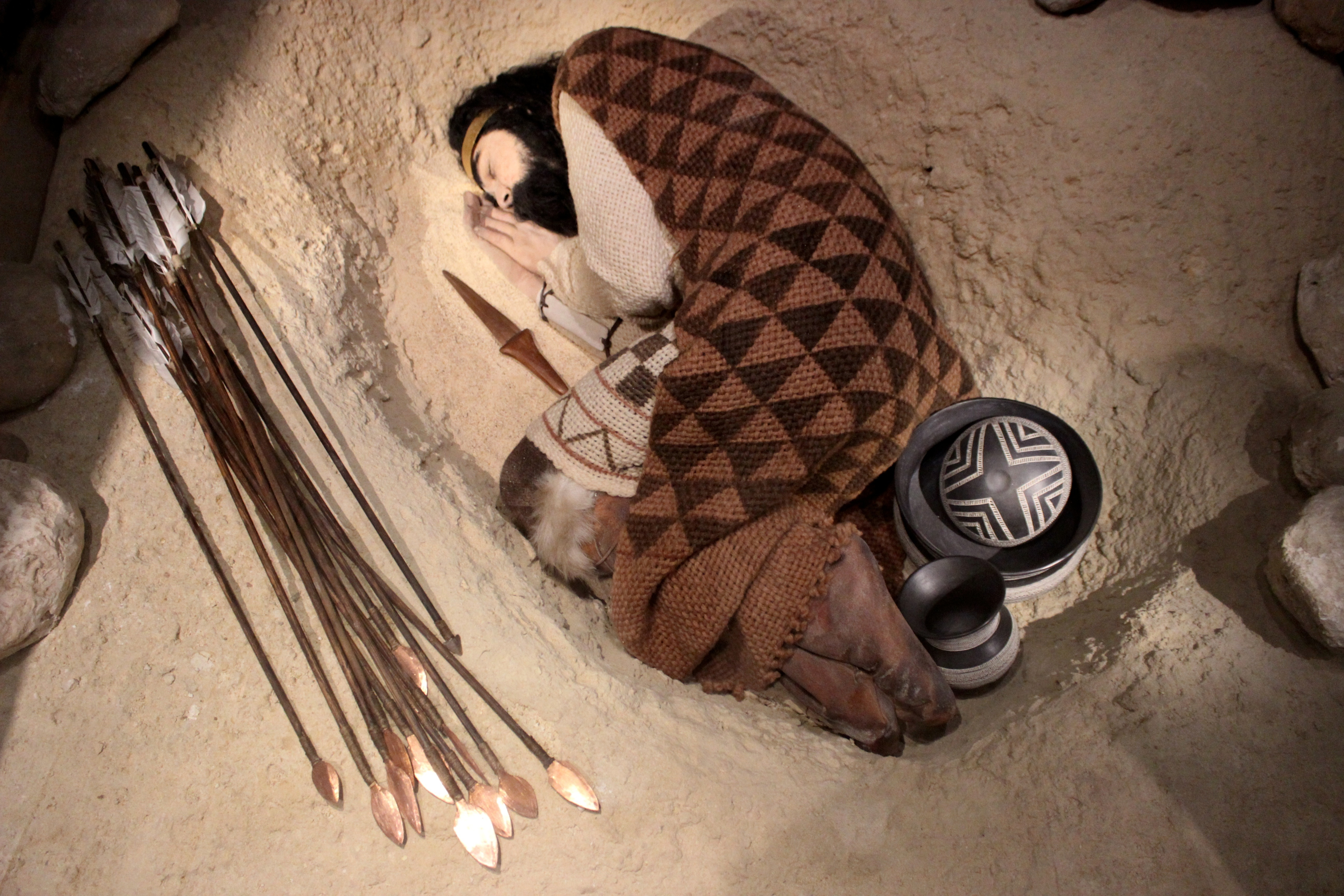
Reconstruction of a Bell Beaker burial, Spain.

Another expansion brought Bell Beaker to Csepel Island in Hungary by about 2500 BCE. In the Carpathian Basin, the Bell Beaker culture came in contact with communities such as the Vučedol culture (c. 3000–2200 BCE), which had evolved partly from the Yamnaya culture (c. 3300–2600 BCE). (Note: Marija Gimbutas characterized the Bell Beaker culture complex as an amalgam of the Vučedol and Yamna culture, formed after the incursion of the Yamna people into the Vučedol milieu and the interaction of these peoples for three or four centuries, from circa 3000 BCE.) In contrast to the early Bell Beaker preference for the dagger and bow, the favourite weapon in the Carpathian Basin during the first half of the third millennium was the shaft-hole axe. Here, Bell Beaker people assimilated local pottery forms such as the polypod cup. These "common ware" types of pottery then spread in association with the classic bell beaker.

The Rhine was on the western edge of the vast Corded Ware zone (c. 3100 – c. 2350 BCE), forming a contact zone with the Bell Beaker culture. From there, the Bell Beaker culture spread further into Eastern Europe, replacing the Corded Ware culture up to the Vistula (Poland). (Note: See Anthrogenica, Eurogenes Blog: Hungarian Yamnaya > Bell Beakers?, for a number of maps.)

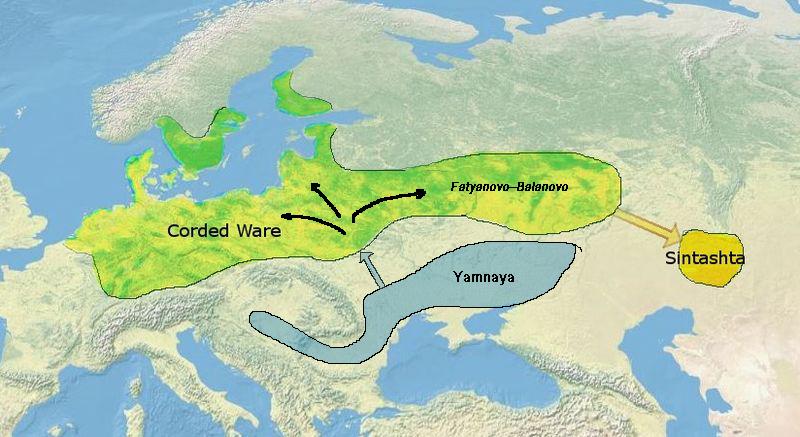
Corded Ware, Yamnaya and Sintashta cultures

The earliest copper production in Ireland, identified at Ross Island in the period 2400–2200 BCE, was associated with early Beaker pottery. Here, the local sulpharsenide ores were smelted to produce the first copper axes used in Britain and Ireland. The same technologies were used in the Tagus region and in the west and south of France. The evidence is sufficient to support the suggestion that the initial spread of Maritime Bell Beakers along the Atlantic and into the Mediterranean, using sea routes that had long been in operation, was directly associated with the quest for copper and other rare raw materials.

=== Migration vs. acculturation ===
While Bell Beaker (Glockenbecher) was introduced as a term for the artefact type at the beginning of the 20th century, recognition of an archaeological Bell Beaker culture has long been controversial. Its spread has been one of the central questions of the migrationism vs. diffusionism debate in 20th-century archaeology, variously described as due to migration, possibly of small groups of warriors, craftsmen or traders, or due to the diffusion of ideas and object exchange.

==== Migration ====
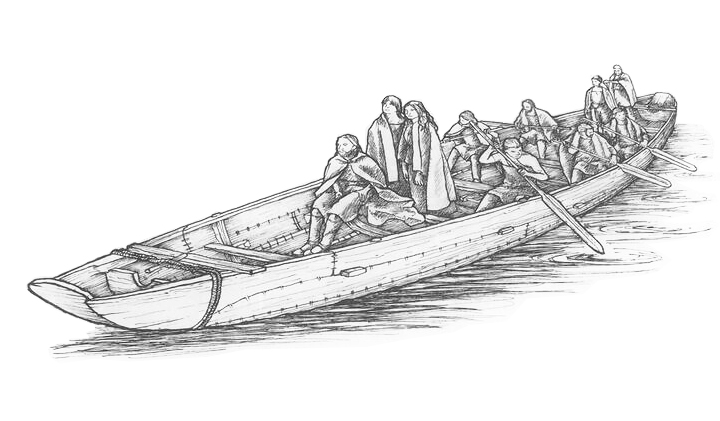
Sewn-plank boat from Ferriby, Britain, c. 2000 BC

Given the unusual form and fabric of Beaker pottery, and its abrupt appearance in the archaeological record, along with a characteristic group of other artefacts, known as the Bell Beaker "package", the explanation for the Beaker culture until the last decades of the 20th century was to interpret it as the migration of one group of people across Europe.

Gordon Childe interpreted the presence of its characteristic artefact as the intrusion of "missionaries" expanding from Iberia along the Atlantic coast, spreading knowledge of copper metallurgy. Stephen Shennan interpreted the artefacts as belonging to a mobile cultural elite imposing itself over the indigenous substrate populations. Similarly, Sangmeister (1972) interpreted the "Beaker folk" (Glockenbecherleute) as small groups of highly mobile traders and artisans. Christian Strahm (1995) used the term "Bell Beaker phenomenon" (Glockenbecher-Phänomen) as a compromise in order to avoid the term "culture".

Heyd (1998) concluded that the Bell Beaker culture was intrusive to southern Germany, and existed contemporarily with the local Corded Ware culture.

The burial ritual which typified Bell Beaker sites appears to be intrusive to Western Europe, from Central Europe. Individual inhumations, often under tumuli with the inclusion of weapons contrast markedly to the preceding Neolithic traditions of often collective, weaponless burials in Atlantic/Western Europe. Such an arrangement is rather derivative of Corded Ware traditions.

A review in 2014 revealed that single burial, communal burial, and reuse of Neolithic burial sites are found throughout the Bell Beaker zone. This overturns a previous conviction that single burial was unknown in the early or southern Bell Beaker zone, and so must have been adopted from Corded Ware in the contact zone of the Lower Rhine, and transmitted westwards along the exchange networks from the Rhine to the Loire, and northwards across the English Channel to Britain.

==== Cultural diffusion ====
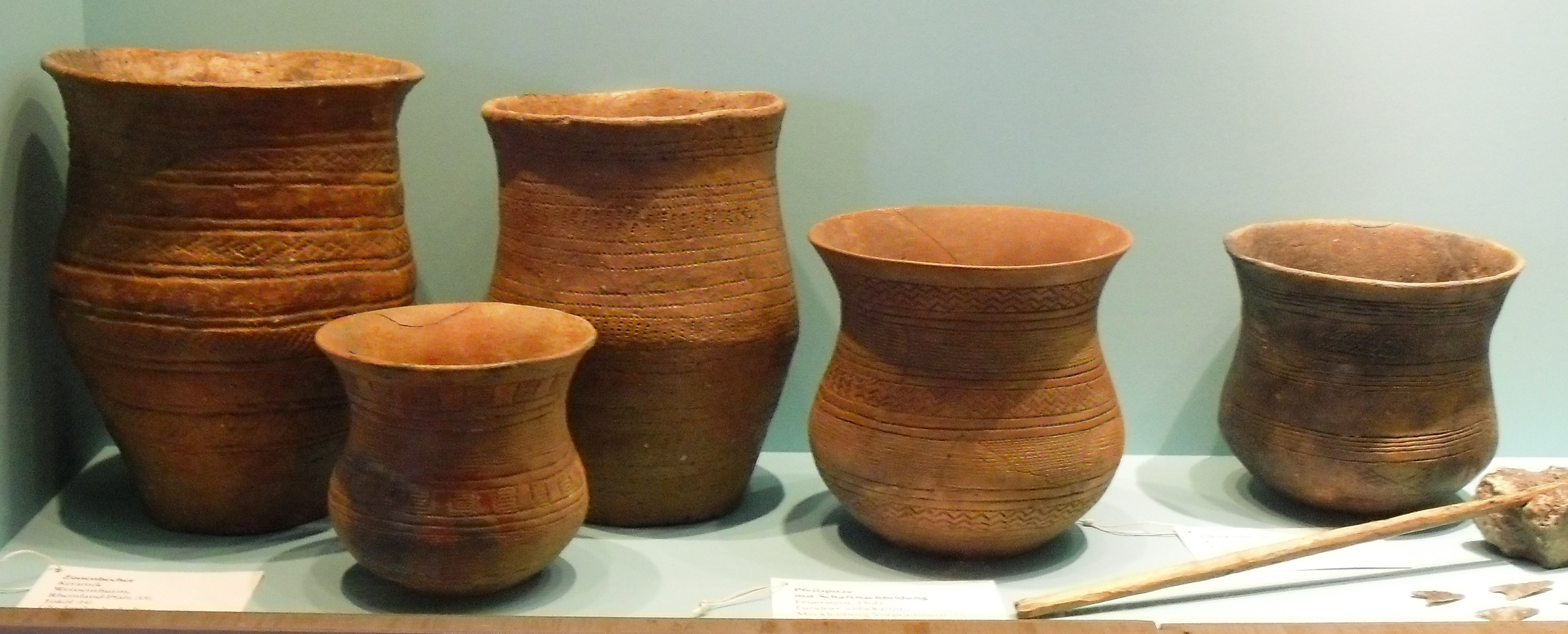
Bell Beakers from Thuringia (Germany) and Tököl (Hungary), c. 2500-2200 BCE

British and American archaeology since the 1960s have been sceptical about prehistoric migration in general, so the idea of "Bell Beaker Folk" lost ground. A theory of cultural contact de-emphasizing population movement was presented by Colin Burgess and Stephen Shennan in the mid-1970s.

Under the "pots, not people" theory, the Beaker culture was seen as a 'package' of knowledge (including religious beliefs, as well as methods of copper, bronze, and gold working) and artefacts (including copper daggers, v-perforated buttons, and stone wrist-guards) adopted and adapted by the indigenous peoples of Europe to varying degrees. This new knowledge may have come about by any combination of population movements and cultural contact. An example might be as part of a prestige cult related to the production and consumption of beer, or trading links such as those demonstrated by finds made along the seaways of Atlantic Europe. Palynological studies including analysis of pollen, associated with the spread of beakers, certainly suggests increased growing of barley, which may be associated with beer brewing. Noting the distribution of Beakers was highest in areas of transport routes, including fording sites, river valleys and mountain passes, Beaker 'folk' were suggested to be originally bronze traders, who subsequently settled within local Neolithic or early Chalcolithic cultures, creating local styles. Close analysis of the bronze tools associated with beaker use suggests an early Iberian source for the copper, followed subsequently by Central European and Bohemian ores.

Beaker style appears to have evolved continually from a pre-Beaker period in the lower Rhine and North Sea regions, at least for Northern and Central Europe.

==== Renewed emphasis on migration ====
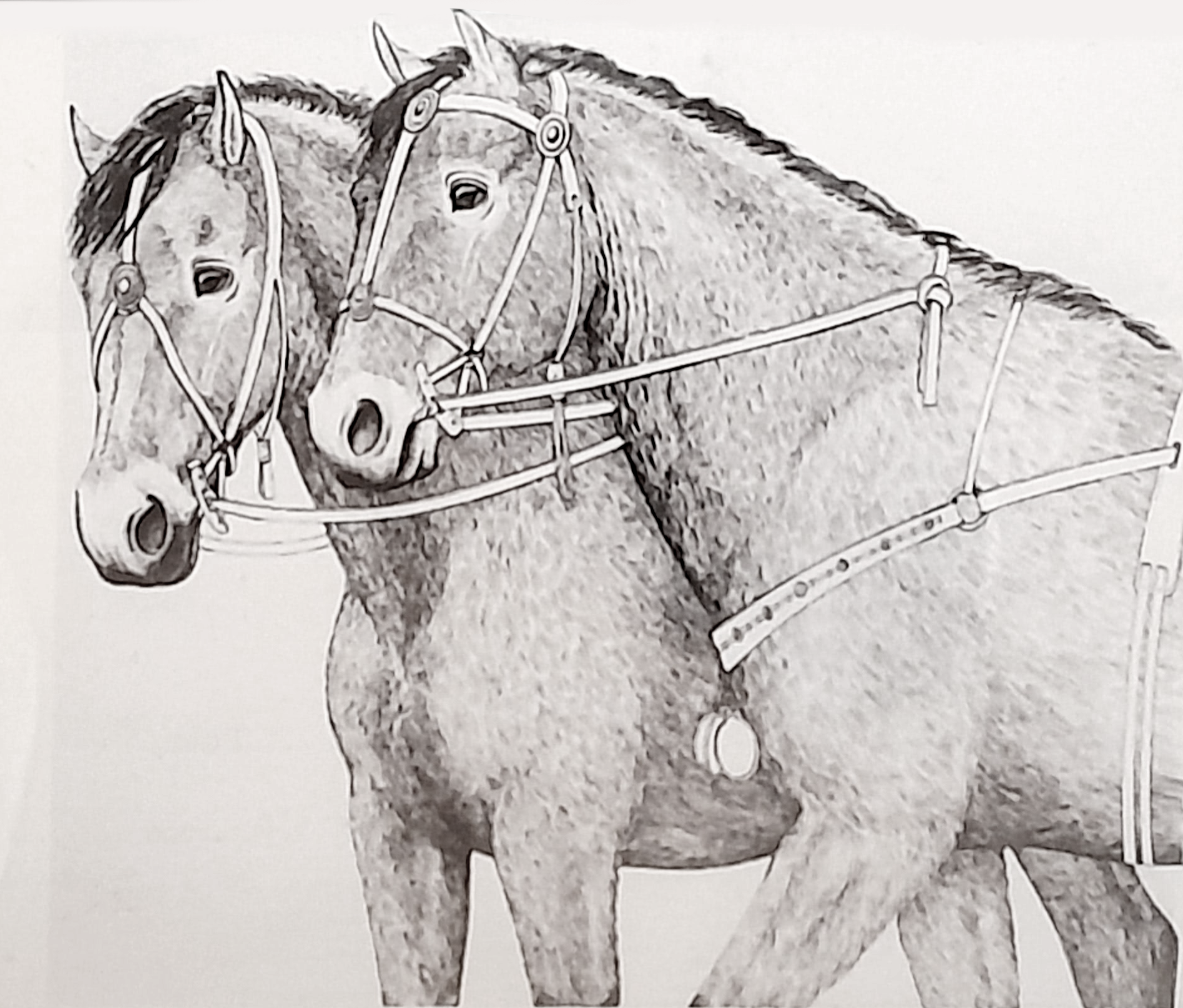
Illustration of early Bronze Age horse bridles from Britain.

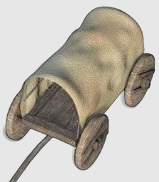
Illustration of a Bell Beaker period wagon

Investigations in the Mediterranean and France in the 2000s moved the discussion to re-emphasise the importance of migration to the Bell Beaker story. Instead of being pictured as a fashion or a simple diffusion of objects and their use, the investigation of over 300 sites showed that human groups actually moved in a process that involved explorations, contacts, settlement, diffusion, and acculturation/assimilation.

Some elements show the influence from the north and east, and other elements reveal the south-east of France to be an important crossroad on an important route of communication and exchange spreading north. A distinctive 'barbed wire' pottery decoration is thought to have migrated through central Italy first. The pattern of movements was diverse and complicated, along the Atlantic coast and the northern Mediterranean coast, and sometimes also far inland. The prominent central role of Portugal in the region and the quality of the pottery all across Europe are forwarded as arguments for a new interpretation that denies an ideological dimension.

Genetic findings also lend support to the migratory hypothesis. A strontium isotope analysis of 86 people from Bell Beaker graves in Bavaria, suggests that 18–25% of all graves were occupied by people who came from a considerable distance outside the area. This was true of children and adults, indicative of some significant migration wave. Given the similarities with readings from people living on loess soils, the general direction of the local movement is from the northeast to the southwest.

Archaeogenetics studies of the 2010s have been able to resolve the "migrationist vs. diffusionist" question to some extent. The study by Olalde et al. (2018) found only "limited genetic affinity" between individuals associated with the Beaker complex in Iberia and in Central Europe, suggesting that migration played a limited role in its early spread. However, the same study found that the further dissemination of the mature Beaker complex was very strongly linked to migration. This is true especially for Britain, where the spread of the Beaker culture introduced high levels of steppe-related ancestry, resulting in a near-complete transformation of the local gene pool within a few centuries, to the point of replacement of about 90% of the local Neolithic-derived lineages.

== Bell Beaker artifacts ==
The two main international bell beaker styles are: the All Over Ornamented (AOO), patterned all over with impressions, of which a subset is the All Over Corded (AOC), patterned with cord-impressions; and the Maritime type, decorated with bands filled with impressions made with a comb or cord. Later, other characteristic regional styles developed.

The beakers are suggested to have been designed for the consumption of alcohol, and the introduction of the substance to Europe may have fuelled the beakers' spread. Beer and mead content have been identified from certain examples. However, not all Beakers were drinking cups. Some were used as reduction pots to smelt copper ores, others have some organic residues associated with food, and still others were employed as funerary urns.

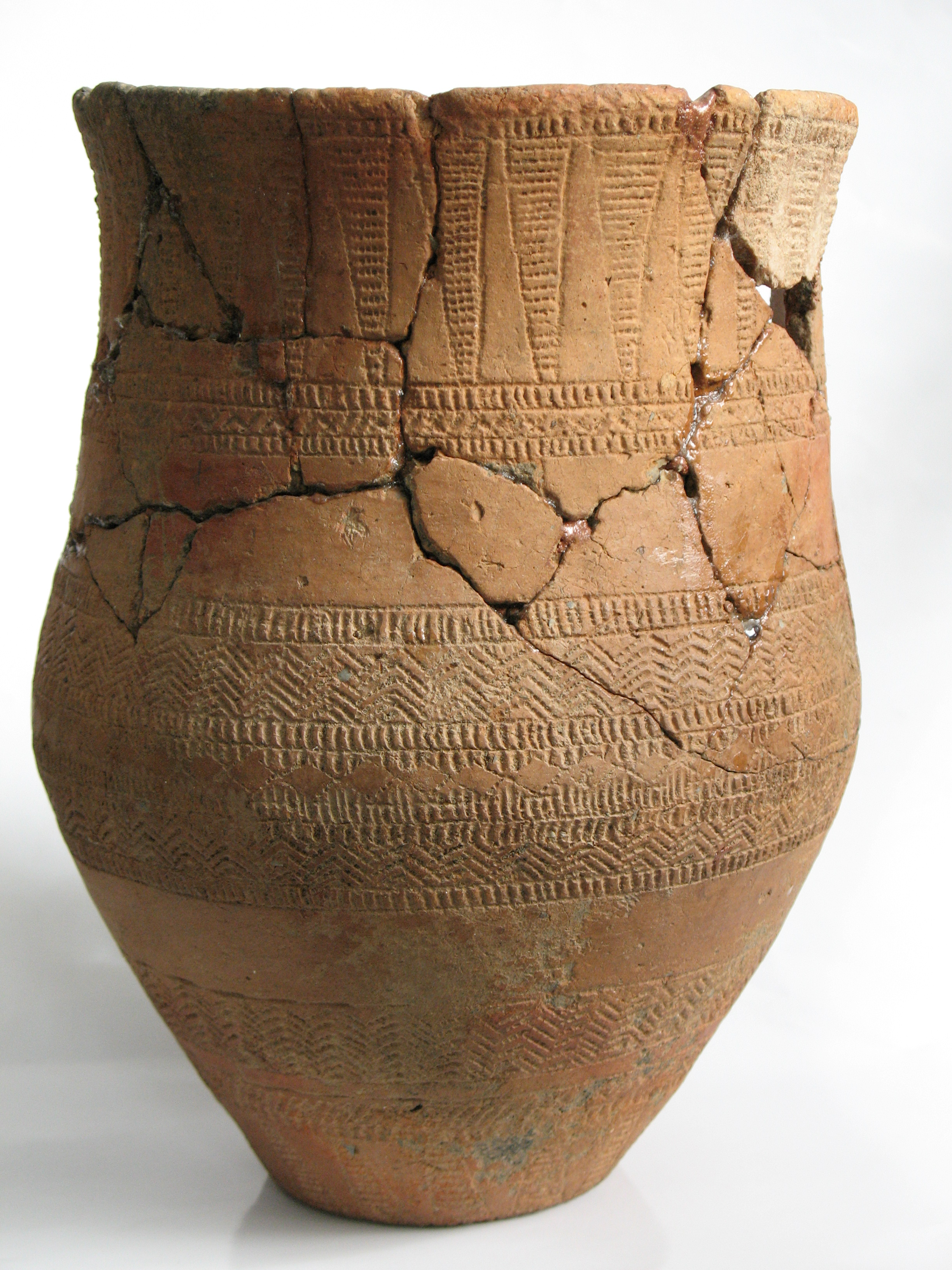
Bell Beaker, France, c. 2500 BCE

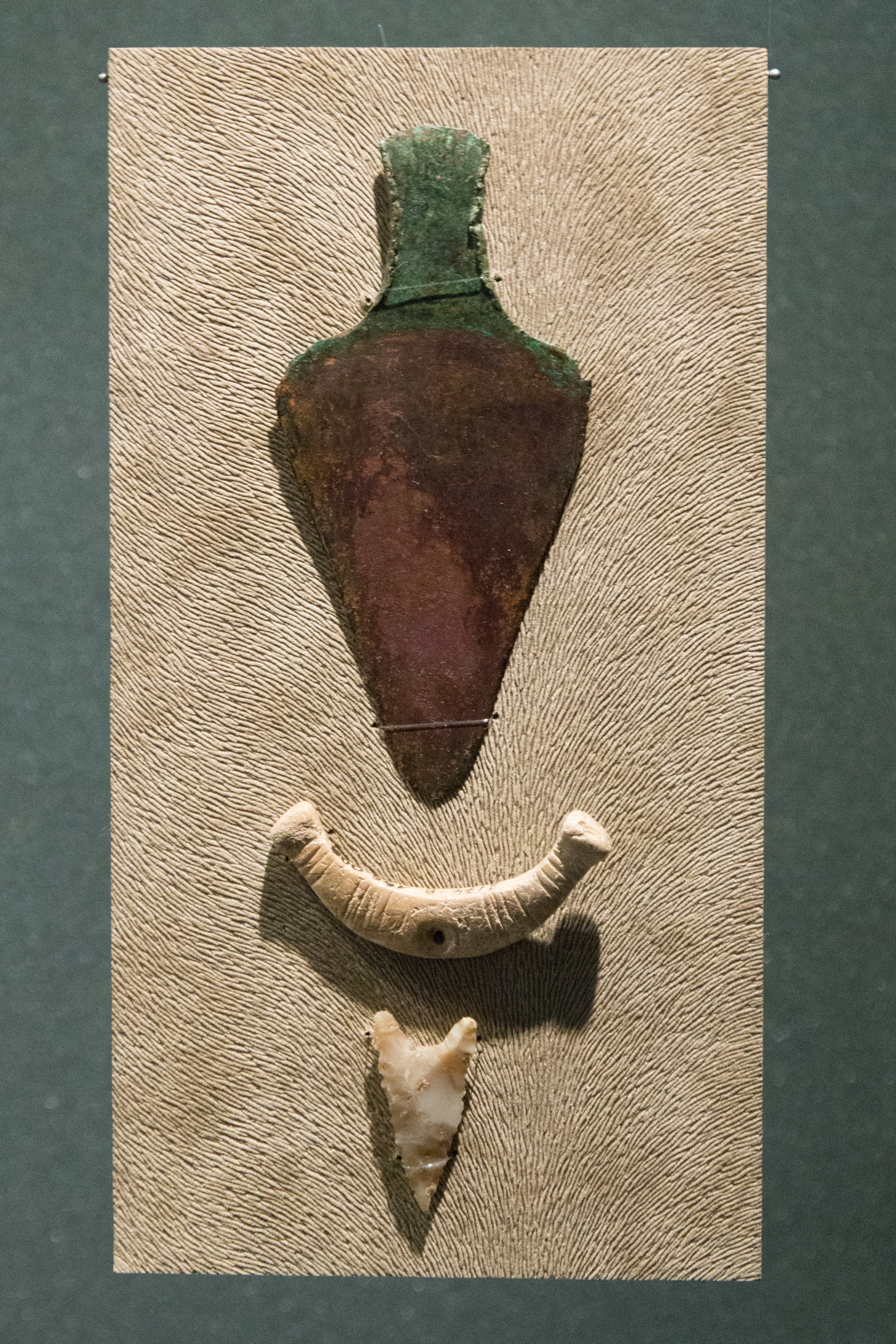
Votive dagger and bow-shaped pendant, Czech Republic

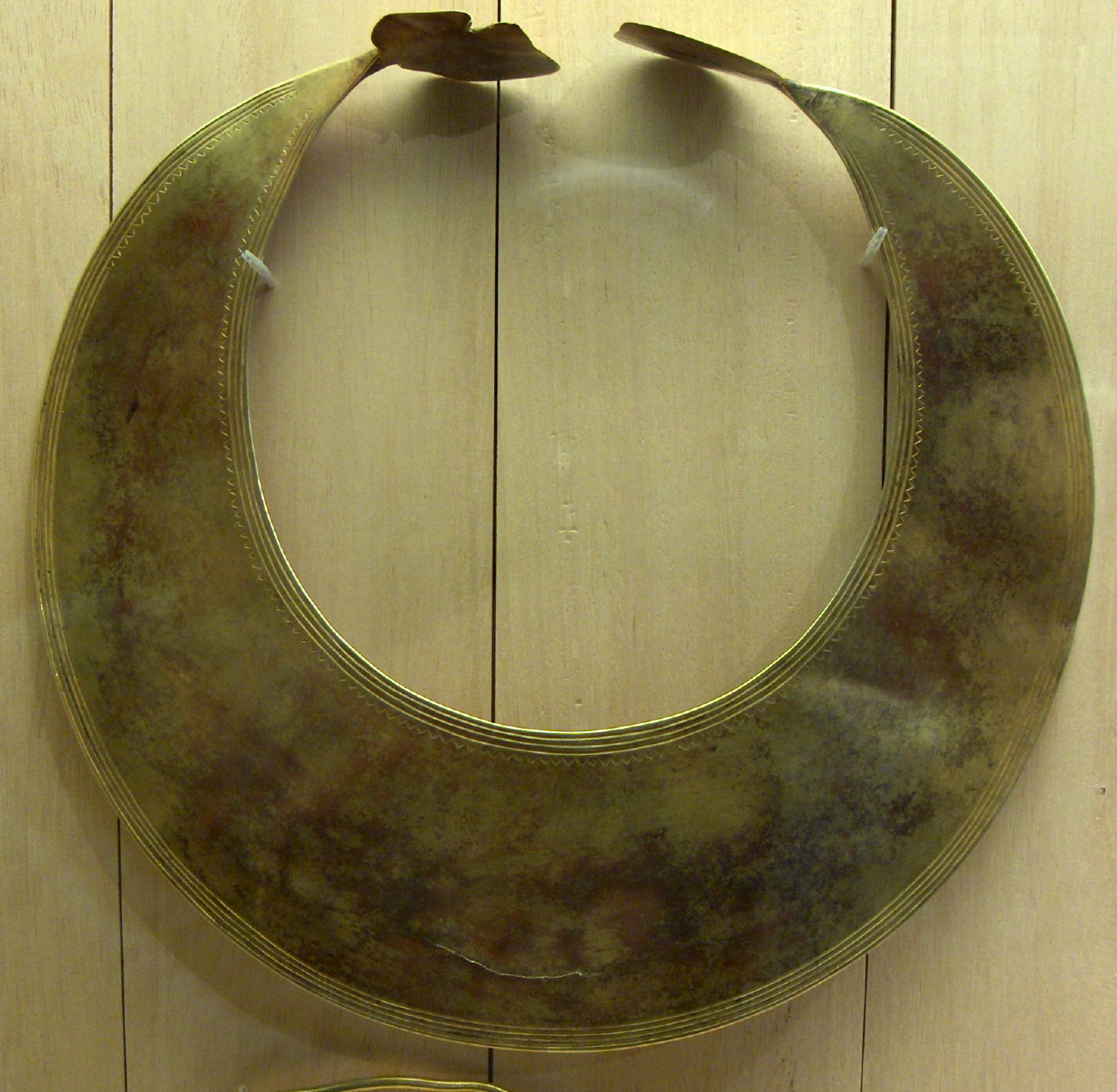
Gold lunula, Brittany, France

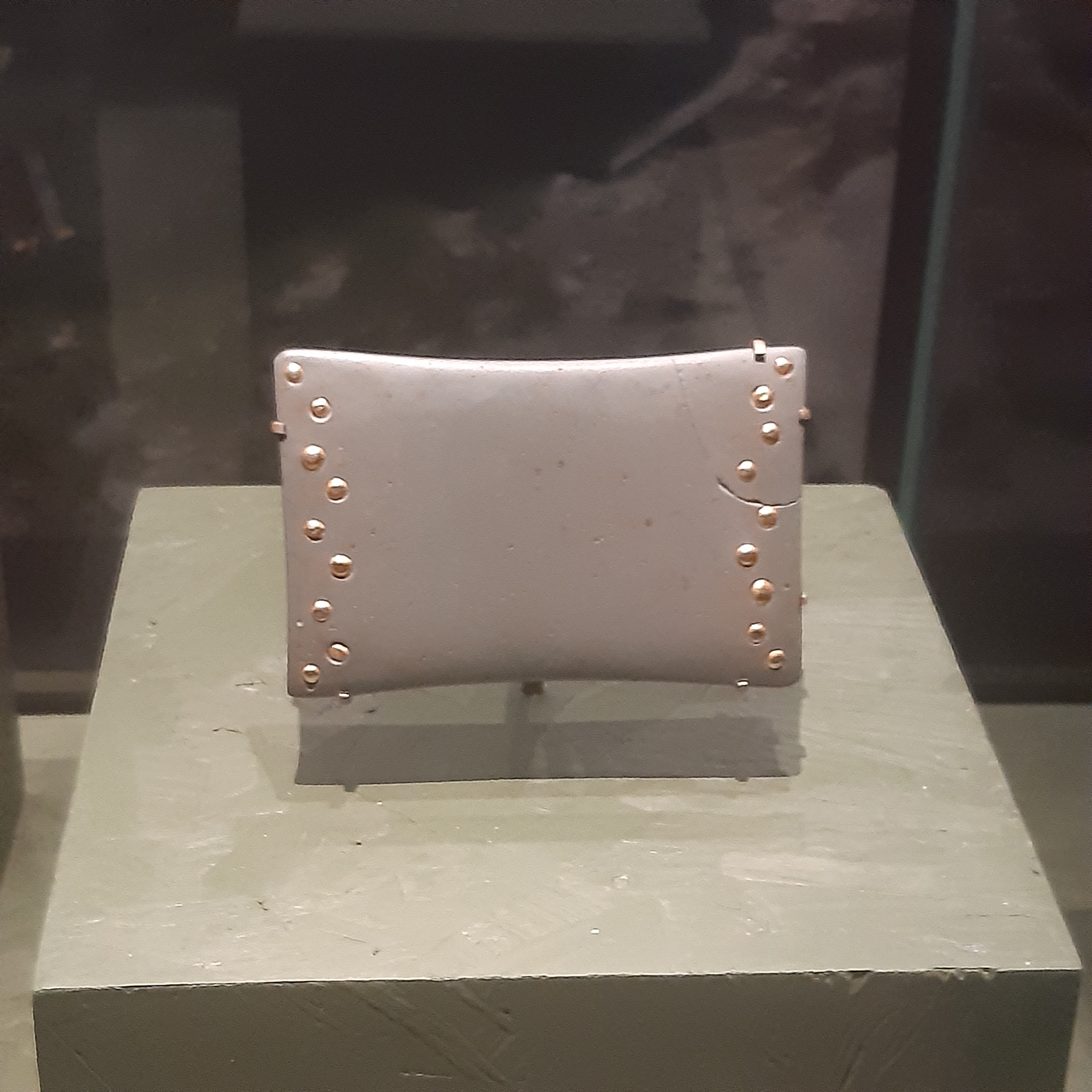
Stone wrist-guard with gold studs, England, c. 2200 BCE

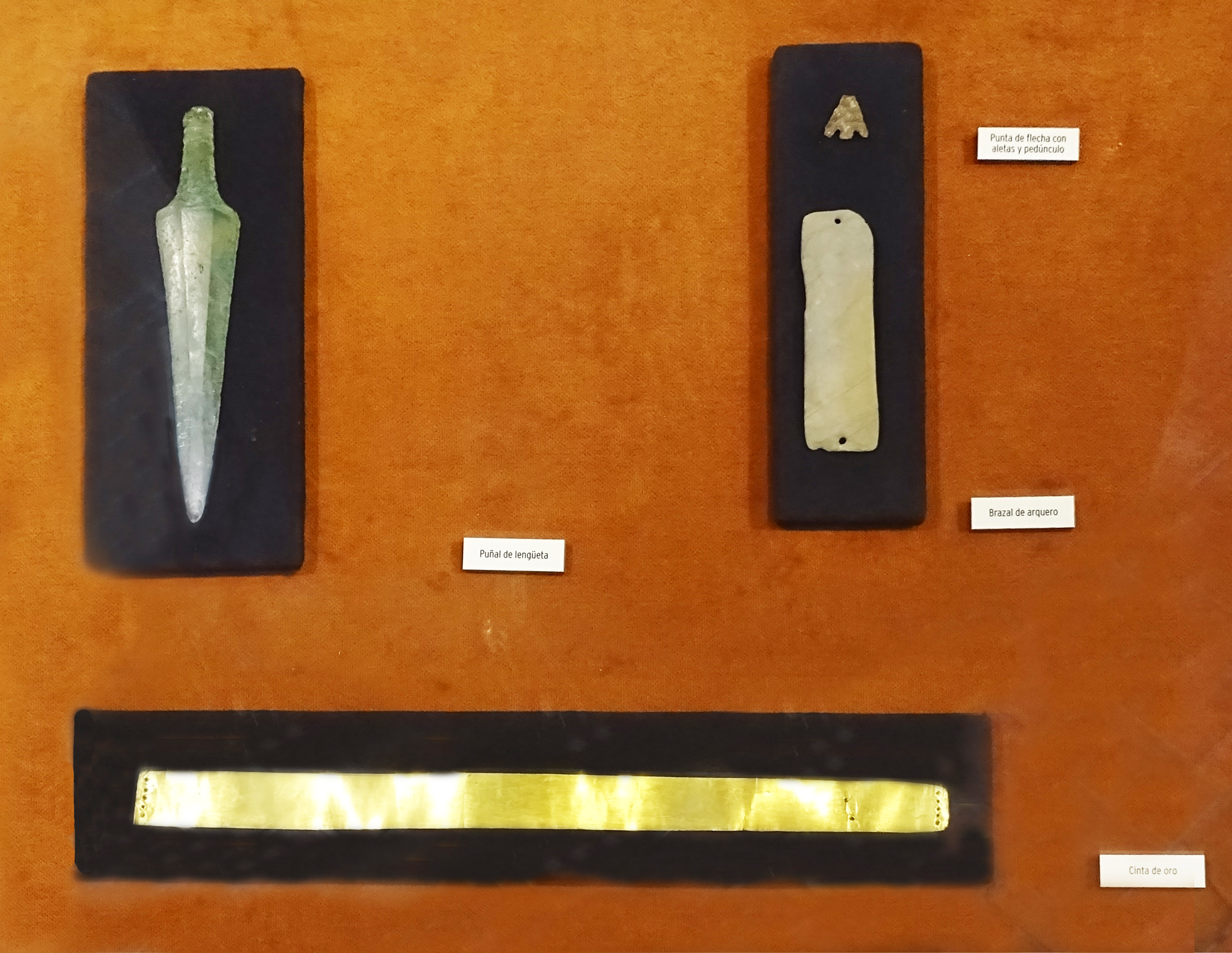
Metal dagger, gold diadem and wristguard, Spain.

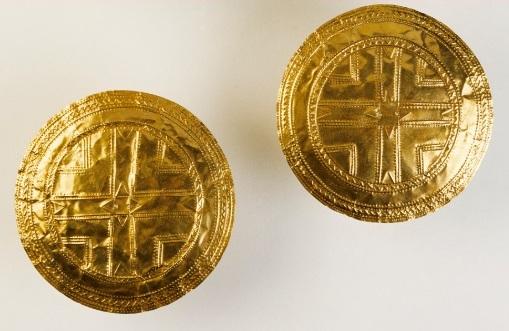
Gold discs, Ireland, c. 2200-2000 BCE

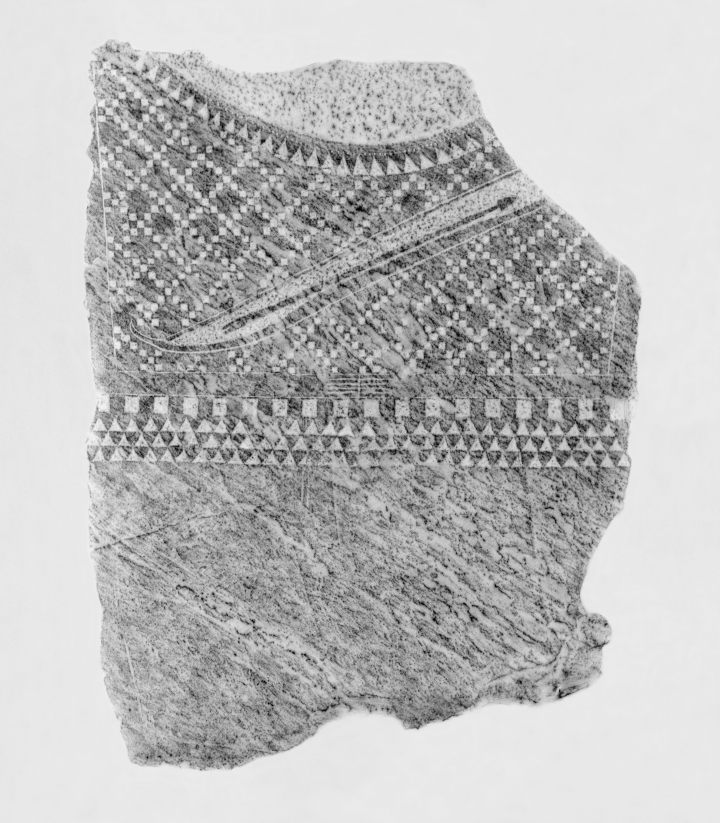
Stele fragment depicting patterned clothing, Switzerland, c. 2500 BCE

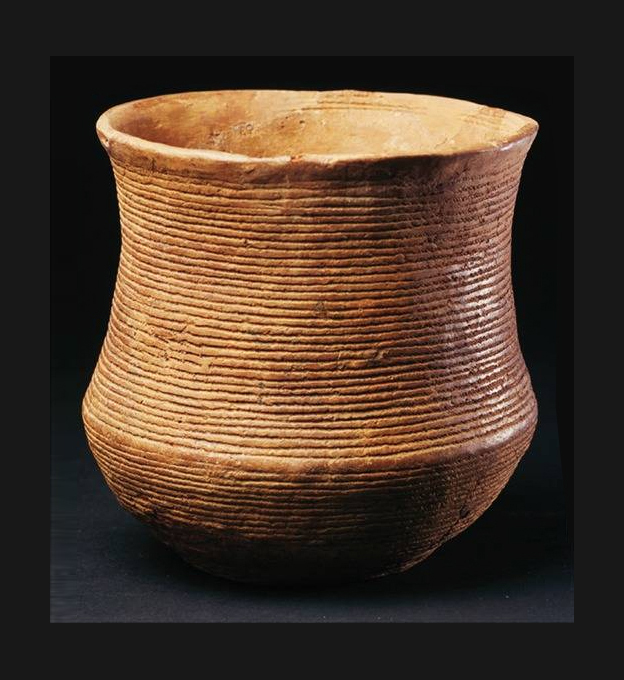
All Over Corded beaker, Scotland

== Postulated linguistic connections ==
As the Beaker culture left no written records, all theories regarding the language or languages they spoke remain conjectural.

James Mallory (2013) notes that the Beaker culture was associated with a hypothetical cluster of Indo-European dialects termed "North-West Indo-European", a cluster which includes the (predecessors of) Celtic, Italic, Germanic and Balto-Slavic branches. Earlier theories suggested a link to the hypothesised Italo-Celtic, or Proto-Celtic languages.

== Physical anthropology ==
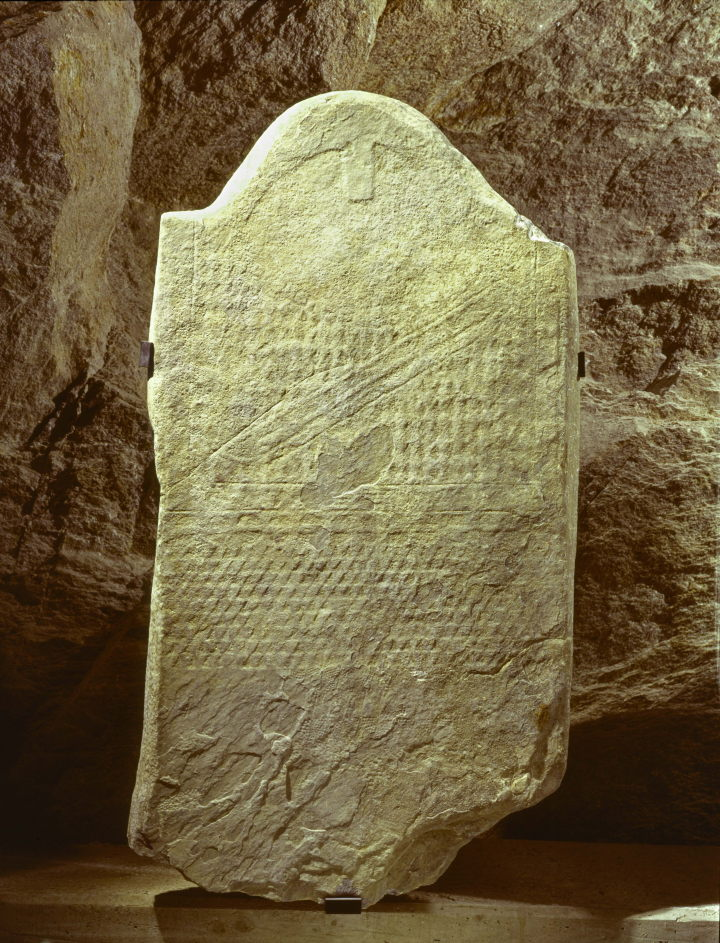
Anthropomorphic stele from Sion, Switzerland, 2700–2150 BCE

Historical craniometric studies found that the Beaker people appeared to be of a different physical type than those earlier populations in the same geographic areas. They were described as tall, heavy boned and brachycephalic. The early studies on the Beakers which were based on the analysis of their skeletal remains, were craniometric. This apparent evidence of migration was in line with archaeological discoveries linking Beaker culture to new farming techniques, mortuary practices, copper-working skills, and other cultural innovations. However, such evidence from skeletal remains was brushed aside as a new movement developed in archaeology from the 1960s, which stressed cultural continuity. Anti-migrationist authors either paid little attention to skeletal evidence or argued that differences could be explained by environmental and cultural influences. Margaret Cox and Simon Mays sum up the position: "Although it can hardly be said that craniometric data provide an unequivocal answer to the problem of the Beaker folk, the balance of the evidence would at present seem to favour a migration hypothesis."

Non-metrical research concerning the Beaker people in Britain also cautiously pointed in the direction of migration. Subsequent studies, such as one concerning the Carpathian Basin, and a non-metrical analysis of skeletons in central-southern Germany, have also identified marked typological differences with the pre-Beaker inhabitants.

Jocelyne Desideri examined the teeth in skeletons from Bell Beaker sites in Northern Spain, Southern France, Switzerland, the Czech Republic and Hungary. Examining dental characteristics that have been independently shown to correlate with genetic relatedness, she found that only in Northern Spain and the Czech Republic were there demonstrable links between immediately previous populations and Bell Beaker populations. Elsewhere there was a discontinuity.

== Genetics ==
=== Iberia ===
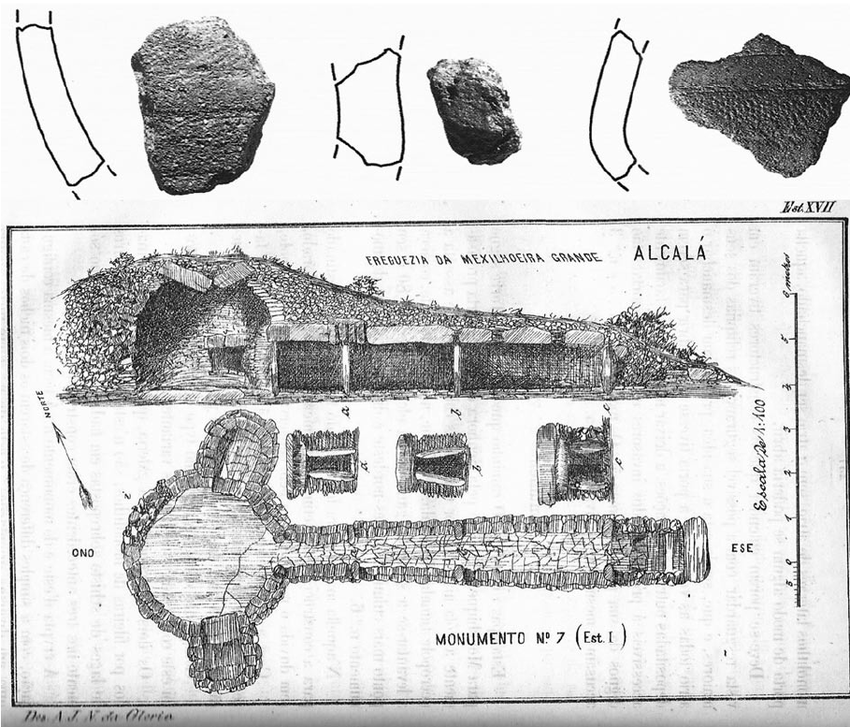
Fragments of Maritime Beaker vessels from the construction levels of the Tholos de Alcalar 7, Portugal, c. 2500 BCE

The earliest Bell Beaker samples in Iberia lacked Steppe ancestry, but between ~2500 and 2000 BCE there was a replacement of 40% of Iberia's ancestry and nearly 100% of its Y-chromosomes by people with Steppe ancestry. Y-chromosome lineages common in Copper Age Iberia (I2, G2, H) were nearly completely replaced by one lineage, R1b-M269. The most plausible source population for this genetic influx was found to be 'Germany Bell Beaker'. The earliest samples with Steppe ancestry were located in northern Spain and were modelled as deriving 60.2% of their ancestry from Germany Bell Beaker and 39.8% from the Iberian Copper Age, whilst Iberian Bronze Age samples from c. 2000 BCE were modelled as 39.6% Germany Bell Beaker and 60.4% Iberia Copper Age. Some Iberian samples had up to 100% Central European Bell Beaker ancestry. A higher percentage of the genetic influx was due to men than women. These results confirm the earlier findings of Patterson et al. (2012) who detected "a signal of gene flow from populations related to present-day northern Europeans into Spain around 2000 BC", which was hypothesised to be a "genetic signal of the Bell Beaker culture".

According to Olalde (2023) Iberian Bell Beaker samples with Steppe ancestry dating from the 3rd and 2nd millennia BCE were approximately third cousins of Bell Beaker individuals from Central Europe, Britain and Scandinavia. The Y-chromosome (patrilineal) lineages of these Iberian samples were derived almost exclusively from Central European ancestors.

Villalba-Mouco et al. (2021) analysed genome-wide data from 136 southern Iberian individuals dating from the Late Neolithic (3300 cal BCE) to the Late Bronze Age (1200/1000 cal BCE). They found that Bronze Age populations, including those from the El Argar culture were "shifted toward populations with steppe-related ancestry from central Europe" compared to preceding Copper Age groups. After 2100 cal BCE, all individuals from all sites carried steppe-related ancestry, in line with R1b-P312 [R1b-M269] becoming the predominant Y-chromosomal lineage. The major additional ancestry source resembled central European Bell Beaker groups, which first contributed ancestry to northern Iberia, followed by a southward spread. According to the authors, "R1b-Z195, the most common Y lineage in BA Iberia, ultimately derives from a common ancestor R1b-P312 in central Europe." The authors propose that the El Argar culture "likely formed from a mixture of new groups arriving from north-central Iberia, which already carried central European steppe-related ancestry (and the predominant Y-chromosome lineage) and local southeastern Iberian CA groups that differed from other regions in Iberia in that they carried excess Iran_Neolithic-like ancestry similar to eastern and/or central Mediterranean groups."

=== Britain and Ireland ===
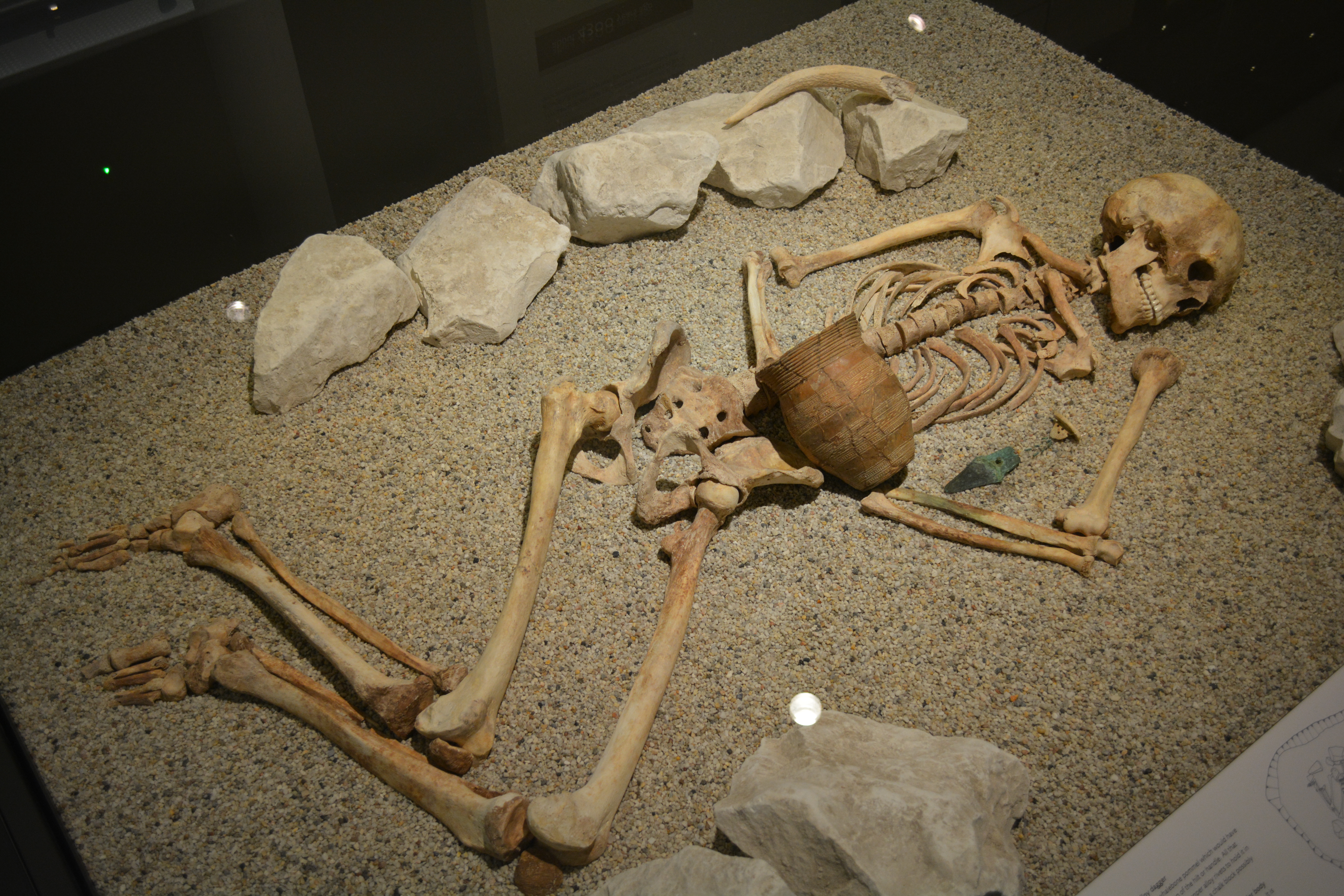
Bell Beaker burial from Shrewton, England, 2470–2210 BCE

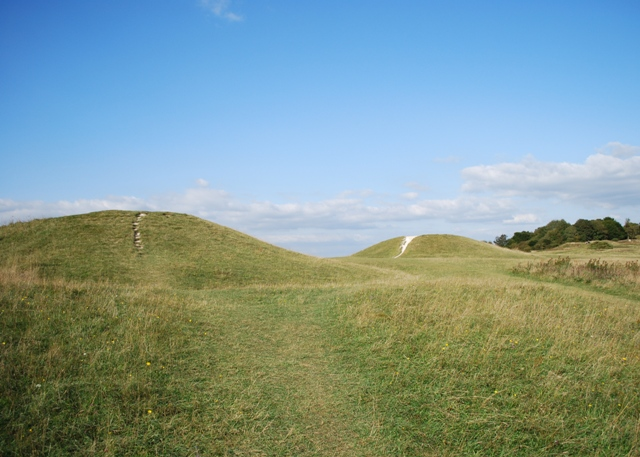
Burial mounds (barrows), Britain

A study by Olalde et al. (2018) confirmed a massive population turnover in western Europe associated with the Bell Beaker culture. In Britain the spread of the Bell Beaker culture introduced high levels of Steppe-related ancestry and was associated with a replacement of ~90% of the gene pool within a few hundred years. British Beaker-associated individuals showed strong similarities to central European Beaker-associated individuals in their genetic profile. Both men and women with Steppe ancestry participated in the turnover in Neolithic Britain, as evidenced by the rise of the paternal haplogroup R1b-M269 and maternal haplogroups I, R1a and U4. The paternal haplogroup R1b was completely absent in Neolithic individuals, but represented more than 90% of the Y-chromosomes during Copper and Bronze Age Britain. The study also found that the Bell Beaker arrivals in Neolithic Britain had significantly higher genetic variants associated with light skin and eye pigmentation than the local population, but low frequencies of the SNP (Single Nucleotide Polymorphism) associated with lactase persistence in modern Europeans.

Strontium and oxygen isotope analysis of the Amesbury Archer, dating from c. 2300 BCE (the richest burial in Britain in this period) found that he spent his childhood in Central Europe, probably in the region of the Alps.

=== France ===
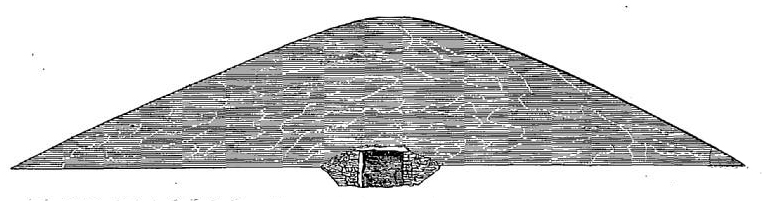
The Kerhué-Bras tumulus with stone burial chamber, France

Bell Beaker samples from France display a wide range of steppe-ancestry proportions, with a very high level of steppe ancestry in a male individual from northern France (with Y-DNA R1b-M269), to ~28% steppe ancestry in a male from southwestern France. As in Iberia, a drastic Y-chromosome turnover occurred during the Bronze Age, with R1b replacing the preexisting diversity of Neolithic lineages. Seguin-Orlando et al. (2023) dated the arrival of steppe ancestry in southern France to ~2,650 BCE.

=== Central and Northern Europe ===
Lee et al. (2012) detected R1b two male skeletons from a German Bell Beaker site dated to 2600–2500 BC at Kromsdorf, one of which tested positive for M269 but negative for its U106 subclade (note that the P312 subclade was not tested for), while for the other skeleton the M269 test was unclear.

Two studies published in 2015 (Haak et al. 2015, Mathieson et al. 2015) found that Bell Beaker individuals from Germany and the Czech Republic had high proportions of Steppe-related ancestry, showing that they derived from mixtures of populations from the Steppe (such as Corded Ware and Yamnaya) and the preceding Neolithic farmers of Europe. The Y-chromosome composition of Beaker-associated males was dominated by R1b-M269, a lineage associated with the arrival of Steppe migrants in central Europe after 3000 BCE. Bell Beaker individuals from Germany analysed by Haak et al. (2015) were found to have less Steppe ancestry than the earlier Corded Ware culture. In a comprehensive study including samples from across Europe, Yediay et al. (2024, preprint) showed conclusively that the steppe ancestry in Bell Beaker populations was derived from the Corded Ware culture, rather than from the Yamnaya culture.

Allentoft et al. (2015) found the people of the Bell Beaker culture to be closely genetically related to the Corded Ware culture, the Únětice culture and the Nordic Bronze Age.

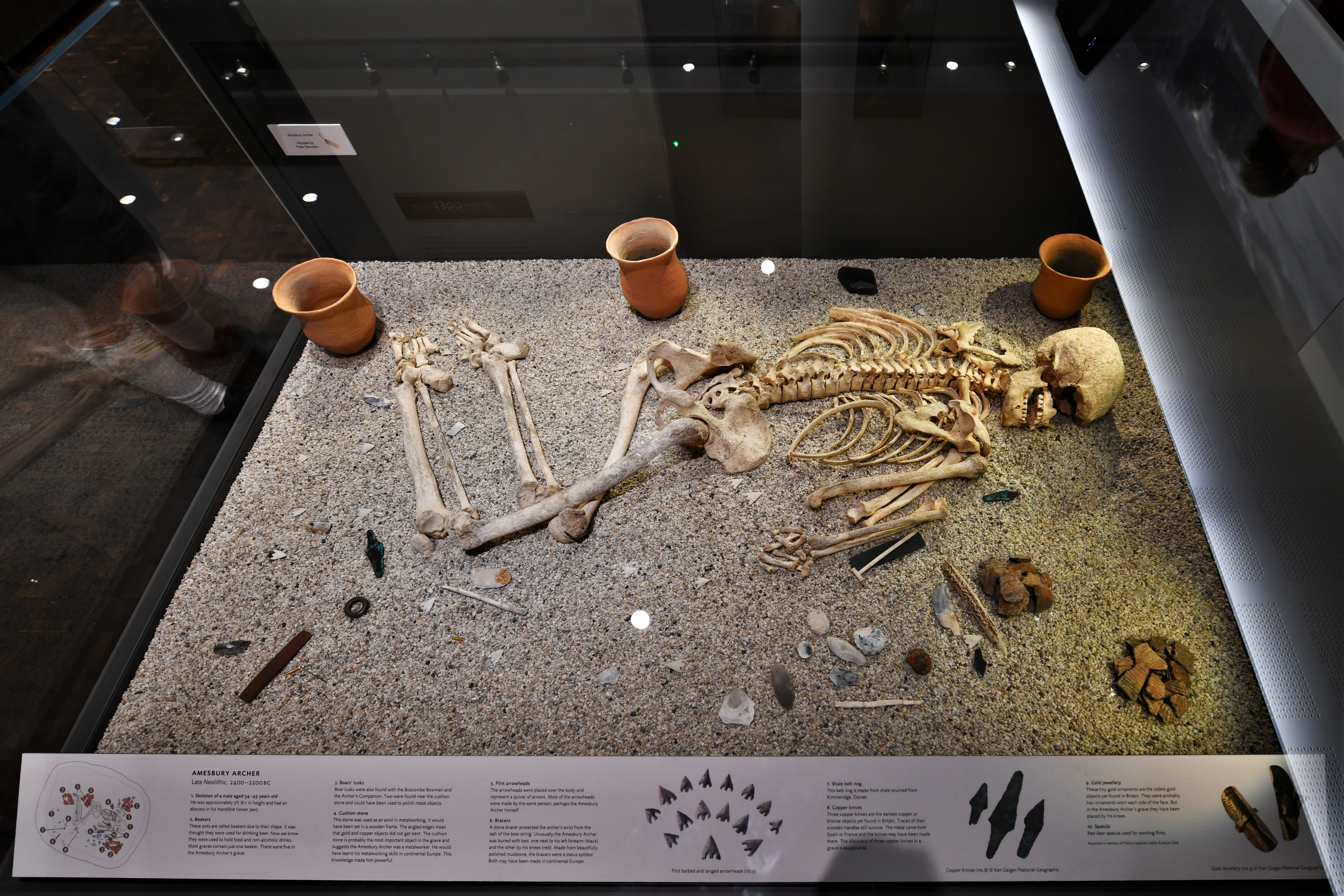
The Amesbury Archer (buried near Stonehenge, England, c. 2300 BCE) grew up in Central Europe. Display at the Salisbury Museum

Furtwängler et al. (2020) analysed 96 ancient genomes from Switzerland, Southern Germany, and the Alsace region in France, covering the Middle/Late Neolithic to Early Bronze Age. They confirmed that R1b arrived in the region during the transitory Bell Beaker period (2800-1800 BCE), along with Steppe-related ancestry. The vast majority of Bell Beaker R1b samples belonged to the U152 > L2 clade (11 out of 14; the other being P312 or L51).

Allentoft et al. (2024) found that individuals from Denmark dating from the 'Dagger Period' (c. 2300–1700 BCE) clustered with central and western European Late Neolithic-Bronze Age individuals dominated by males with lineages of R1b-M269/L51, matching the appearance of Bell Beaker material culture in Denmark at this time.

=== Eastern Europe ===
Papac et al. (2021) found that the earliest Bell Beaker individuals from Bohemia in the Czech Republic had a similar genetic composition to Corded Ware individuals. A closer phylogenetic relationship was observed between the Y-chromosome lineages found in early Corded Ware and Bell Beaker than in either late Corded Ware or Yamnaya and Bell Beaker. R1b-L151 was the most common Y-lineage among early Corded Ware males in Bohemia, and was ancestral to R1b-P312, the dominant Y-lineage found in Bell Beaker males.

Engovatova et al. (2024) found a particularly close genetic similarity between a male from the Abashevo culture in the Middle Volga region of Russia and Bell Beaker populations from Germany and the Czech Republic, reflecting the presence of Bell Beaker elements (as well as Únětice-like elements) in the material culture of Abashevo. The authors attribute this to a long-distance migration of groups from central Europe to the Middle Volga region.

=== Italy ===
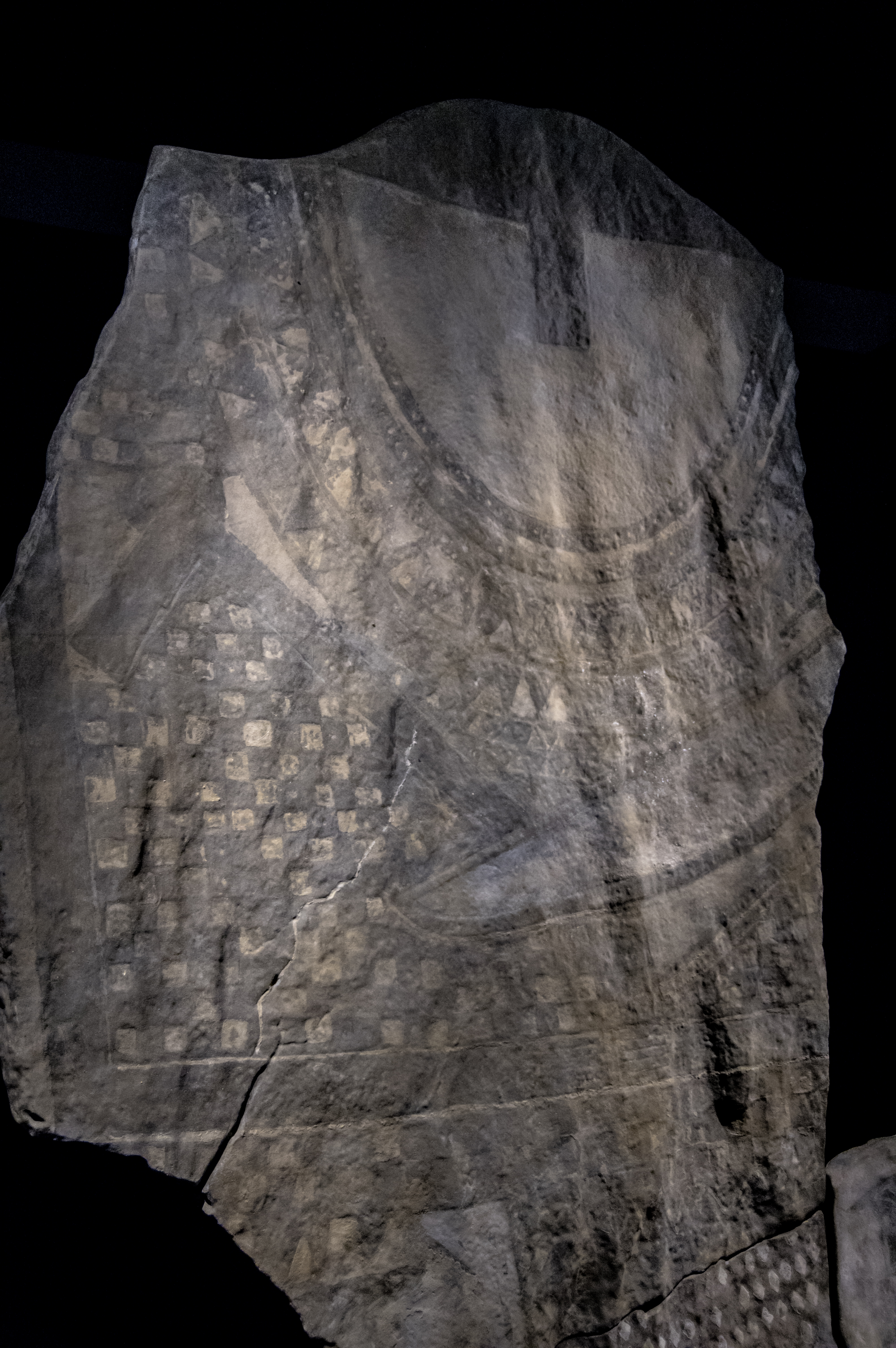
Anthropomorphic stele, Saint-Martin-de-Corléans, Italy

Olalde et al. (2018) analysed three Bell Beaker-associated individuals (one male and two females) from northern Italy (Parma), dating from 2200 to 1930 BCE. Two of the individuals were found to have around 25% Early Bronze Age Steppe-related ancestry whilst one had none. The male belonged to Y-haplogroup R1b1a1a2a1a2 (R1b-M269/P312).

A study by Saupe et al. (2021) found that Bronze Age populations from Northern and Central Italy were characterised by a mix of earlier Chalcolithic ancestry and Steppe-related ancestry. The study found an autosomal affinity of North and Central Italian Bronze Age groups to Late Neolithic Germany, suggesting that Steppe-related ancestry could have arrived through Bell Beaker groups from Central Europe, such as 'Germany Bell Beaker'. Three out of the four Italian Bronze Age males for which the paternal haplogroup could be determined belonged to haplogroup R1, and two of those were of the R1b-L11 lineage, which was absent in earlier Chalcolithic samples but is common in modern Western Europe and in ancient male Bell-Beaker burials.

Posth et al. (2021) found that Iron Age Etruscans from central Italy could be modelled as deriving around 50% of their ancestry from Central European Bell Beakers (represented by Germany Bell Beaker), with around 25-30% steppe ancestry. Two Etruscan samples were modelled as having 80% Germany Bell Beaker ancestry. Overall, the Etruscan samples showed ~75% frequency of the Y-haplogroup R1b, mostly represented by R1b-P312 and its derived R1b-L2 lineage "that diffused across Europe alongside steppe-related ancestry in association with the Bell Beaker complex." According to the authors, the Etruscans carried "a local genetic profile shared with other neighboring populations such as the Latins from Rome and its environs despite the cultural and linguistic differences between the two neighboring groups." Antonio et al. (2019) similarly found that 5 out of 6 male Iron Age Latins samples belonged to the R1b-M269 Y-haplogroup, consistent with "the arrival of Steppe ancestry, via migration of Steppe pastoralists or intermediary populations in the preceding Bronze Age.", and did not find significant genetic differentiation between the Latins and the Etruscans. The Iron Age Latin population showed a clear ancestry shift from the earlier Copper Age, modelled as an introduction of ~30 to 40% steppe ancestry, which was indicative of "large-scale immigration before the Iron Age."

Yediay et al. (2024, Preprint) found that the arrival of steppe ancestry in Italy was mediated by "Bell Beaker populations of Western Europe", likely contributing to the emergence of the Italic and Celtic languages and consistent with the Italo-Celtic linguistic hypothesis. This Bell Beaker-related steppe ancestry was in turn derived from the earlier Corded Ware culture, rather than from the Yamnaya culture.

According to Chintalapatia et al. (2022) a majority of Bronze Age samples from Sardinia lacked steppe-related ancestry, though evidence for steppe-related ancestry was found in a few individuals. This ancestry is estimated to have arrived in Sardinia ~2600 BCE.

=== Periphery ===
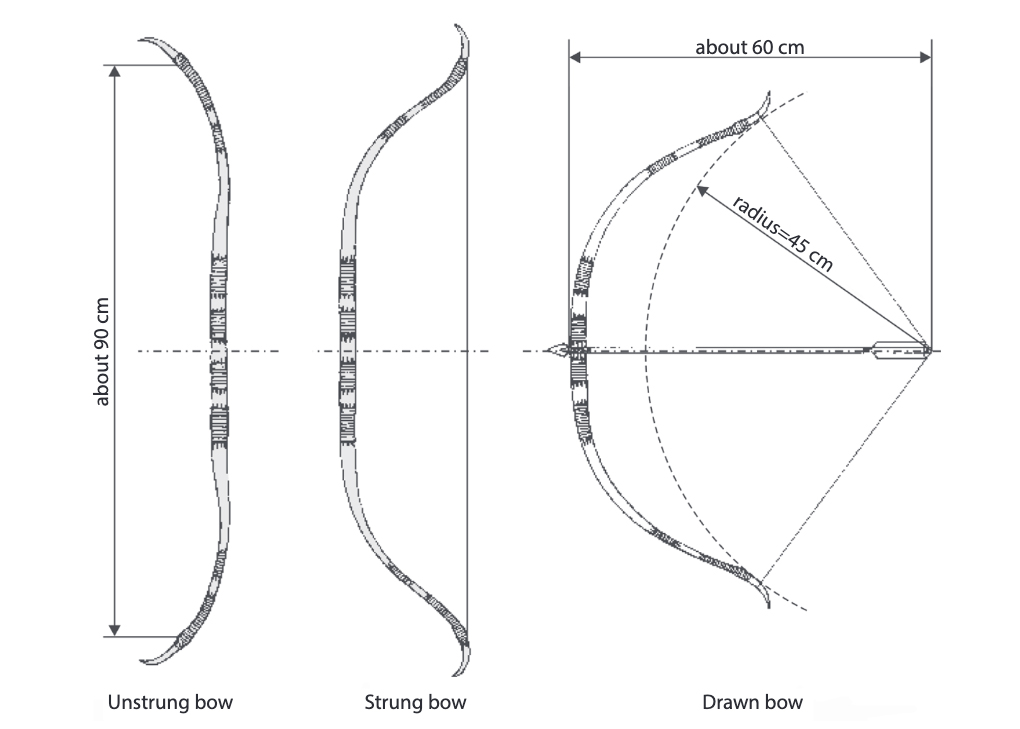
Bell Beaker bow reconstruction. The Bell Beakers used extremely short composite bows, in contrast to the long bows of the Neolithic cultures preceding them. This reconstruction was just 35 inches (90cm) long.

Yediay et al. (2024, Preprint) identified a small amount of Bell Beaker ancestry in some individuals from Bronze Age Greece, "reflecting a connection with Central Eastern Europe" and "contact with the populations from the Balkan Bronze Age". Two outlier individuals from Cyprus, dating from c. 1700 BCE clustered with Scandinavian Bronze Age individuals and were modelled as deriving their ancestry from the Bell Beaker culture. One of these individuals carried the male haplogroup I1 and displayed a non-local strontium isotope signature compatible with an origin in Scandinavia (particularly Sweden), revealing "an extraordinary journey from Scandinavia to Cyprus". This may be related to the presence of ring ingots and dress pins from the Central European Únětice culture in Cyprus from the beginning of the 2nd millennium BCE.

In a 2020 review Fregel et al. identified European Bronze Age ancestry (including Steppe ancestry) in Guanches from the Canary Islands, which could be explained by "the presence of Bell-Beaker pottery in the North African archaeological record" and "the expansion of European Bronze Age populations in North Africa". Serrano et al. 2023 analysed genome-wide data from 49 Guanche individuals, whose ancestry was modelled as comprising 73.3% Morocco Late Neolithic, 6.9% Morocco Early Neolithic, 13.4% Germany Bell Beaker and 6.4% Mota on average. Germany Bell Beaker ancestry reached 16.2% and 17.9% in samples from Gran Canaria and Lanzarote respectively. Bell Beaker-related haplogroups identified in the Guanches include Y-DNA R1b-M269, mtDNA U5 and mtDNA H4a1. These haplogroups have also been identified in mummies from Ancient Egypt.

=== Phenotypes ===
Genetic research shows that the Bell Beakers had a higher frequency of blond hair, blue eyes and light skin than other populations in Europe. The arrival of the Bell Beakers significantly altered the pigmentation phenotypes of British populations. The indigenous population of neolithic Britain was predominantly brown-skinned, brown-eyed and dark-haired, but after the arrival of the Beakers lighter skin, blue eyes and blond hair became more common.

== Extent and impact ==
Bell Beaker culture diffusion map

Bell Beaker people took advantage of transport by sea and rivers, creating a cultural spread extending from Ireland to the Carpathian Basin and south along the Atlantic coast and along the Rhône valley to Portugal, North Africa, and Sicily, even penetrating northern and central Italy. Its remains have been found in what is now Portugal, Spain, France (excluding the central massif), Ireland and Great Britain, the Low Countries and Germany between the Elbe and Rhine, with an extension along the upper Danube into the Vienna Basin (Austria), Hungary and the Czech Republic, with Mediterranean outposts on Sardinia and Sicily; there is less certain evidence for direct penetration in the east.

Beaker-type vessels remained in use longest in Great Britain and Ireland; late beakers in other areas are classified as early Bronze Age (Barbed Wire Beakers in the Netherlands, Giant Beakers (Riesenbecher)). The new international trade routes opened by the Beaker people became firmly established and the culture was succeeded by a number of Bronze Age cultures, among them the Únětice culture in Central Europe, the Elp culture and Hilversum culture in the Netherlands, the Atlantic Bronze Age in Great Britain, Ireland, and the Atlantic coast of Europe, and by the Nordic Bronze Age, a culture of Scandinavia and northernmost Germany–Poland.

=== Iberian Peninsula ===
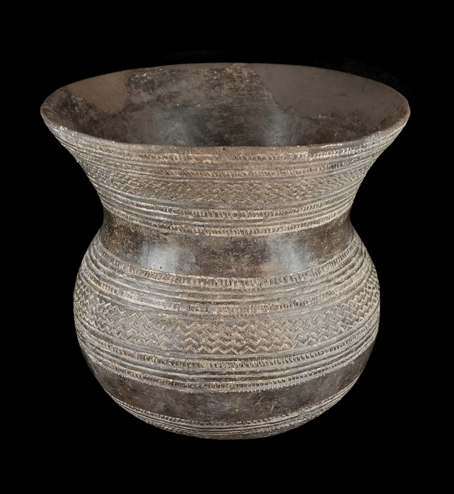
Bell Beaker from Ciempozuelos, Spain

The Bell Beaker phenomenon in the Iberian Peninsula defines the late phase of the local Chalcolithic and even intrudes in the earliest centuries of the Bronze Age. A review of radiocarbon dates for Bell Beaker across Europe found that some of the earliest were found in Portugal, c. 2750 BCE, in contrast to the rather later range for Andalusia (c. 2500–2200 BCE).

At present, no internal chronology for the various Bell Beaker-related styles has been achieved yet for Iberia. Peninsular corded Bell Beakers are usually found in coastal or near coastal regions in three main regions: the western Pyrenees, the lower Ebro and adjacent east coast, and the northwest (Galicia and northern Portugal). A corded-zoned Maritime variety (C/ZM), proposed to be a hybrid between AOC and Maritime Herringbone, was mainly found in burial contexts and expanded westward, especially along the mountain systems of the Meseta.

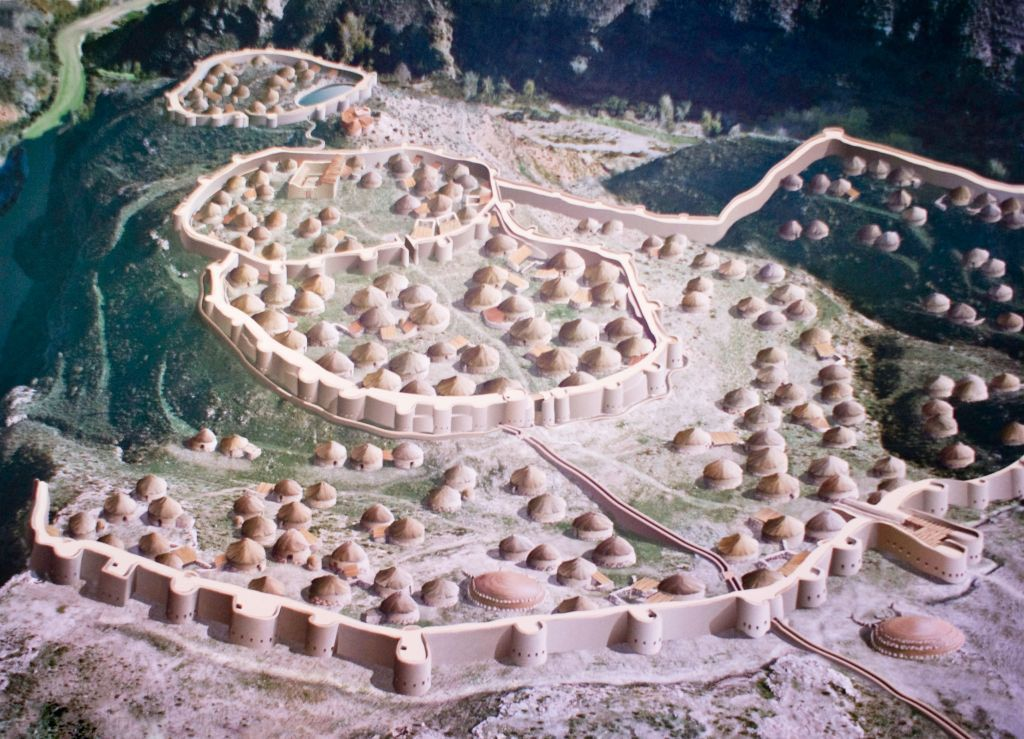
Painting of Los Millares, Spain

With some notable exceptions, most Iberian early Bell Beaker "burials" are at or near the coastal regions. As for the settlements and monuments within the Iberian context, Beaker pottery is generally found in association with local Chalcolithic material and appears most of all as an "intrusion" from the third millennium in burial monuments whose origin may go back to the fourth or fifth millennia BCE.

Very early dates for Bell Beakers were found in Castelo Velho de Freixo de Numão in Guarda, central Portugal. The site was located on the summit of a spur. A short-lived first occupation of pre-Bell Beaker building phase at c. 3000 BCE revealed the remains of a tower, some pavings, and structures for burning. After a break of one or two centuries, Bell Beaker pottery was introduced in a second building phase that lasted to the Early Bronze Age, c. 1800 BCE. A third building phase followed directly and lasted to c. 1300 BCE, after which the site was covered with layers of stone and clay, apparently deliberately, and abandoned.

The second building phase was dominated by a highly coherent group of pottery within the regional Chalcolithic styles, representing Maritime Bell Beakers of the local (northern Portuguese), penteada decoration style in various patterns, using lines of points, incision or impression. Three of them were carbon dated to the first half of the third millennium BCE. The site demonstrates a notable absence of more common Bell Beaker pottery styles such as Maritime Herringbone and Maritime Lined varieties found in nearby sites such as Castanheiro do Vento and Crasto de Palheiros.

One non-local Bell Beaker sherd, however, belonging to the upper part of a beaker with a curved neck and thin walls, was found at the bedrock base of this second phase. The technique and patterning are classic forms in the context of pure European and Peninsular corded ware. In the Iberian Peninsula, this AOC type was traditionally restricted to half a dozen scattered sites in the western Pyrenees, the lower Ebro, and the Spanish east coast; especially a vessel at Filomena at Villarreal, Castellón (Spain), has parallels with the decoration. In Porto Torrão, at inner Alentejo (southern Portugal), a similar vessel was found having a date ultimately corrected to c.2823–2658 BCE. All pottery was locally made. The lack or presence of Bell Beaker elements is the basis for the division of Los Millares and Vila Nova cultures into two periods: I and II.

A gold lunula with two gold discs was found in Cabeceiras de Basto, Portugal, dating from the Bell Beaker period.

In 2016 archaeologists discovered a large circular earthwork enclosure in southern Spain near Carmona (Sevilla), dating from the Bell Beaker period, c.2600–2200 BCE. The complex of concentric rings, known as 'La Loma del Real Tesoro II' may have been used for holding rituals. A contemporary large circular enclosure is known from Perdigões in southern Portugal. Circular earth and timber enclosures are also known from Germany, Ireland and the Netherlands in this period, as well as Stonehenge in England.

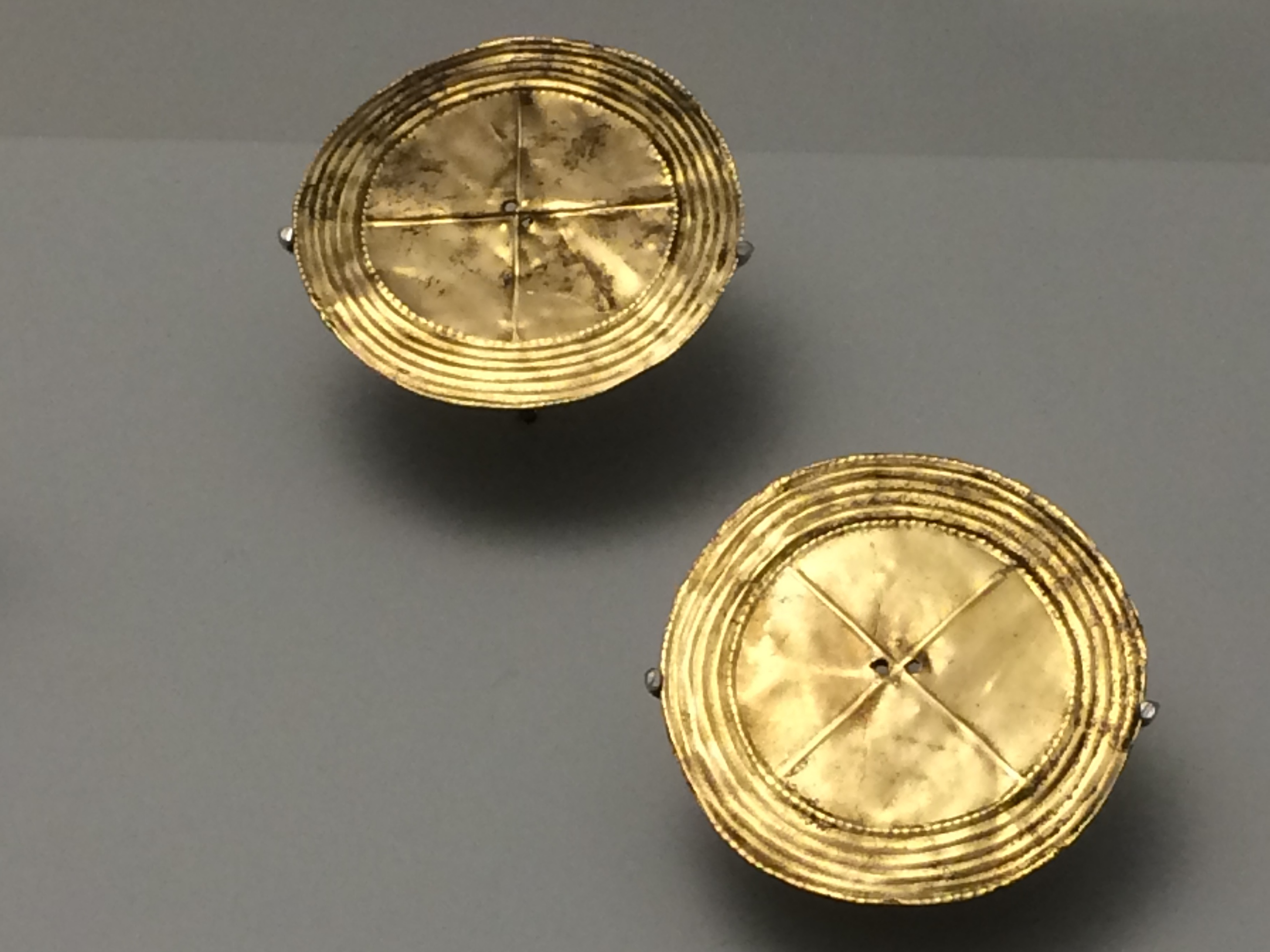
Gold discs from western Asturias, Spain.

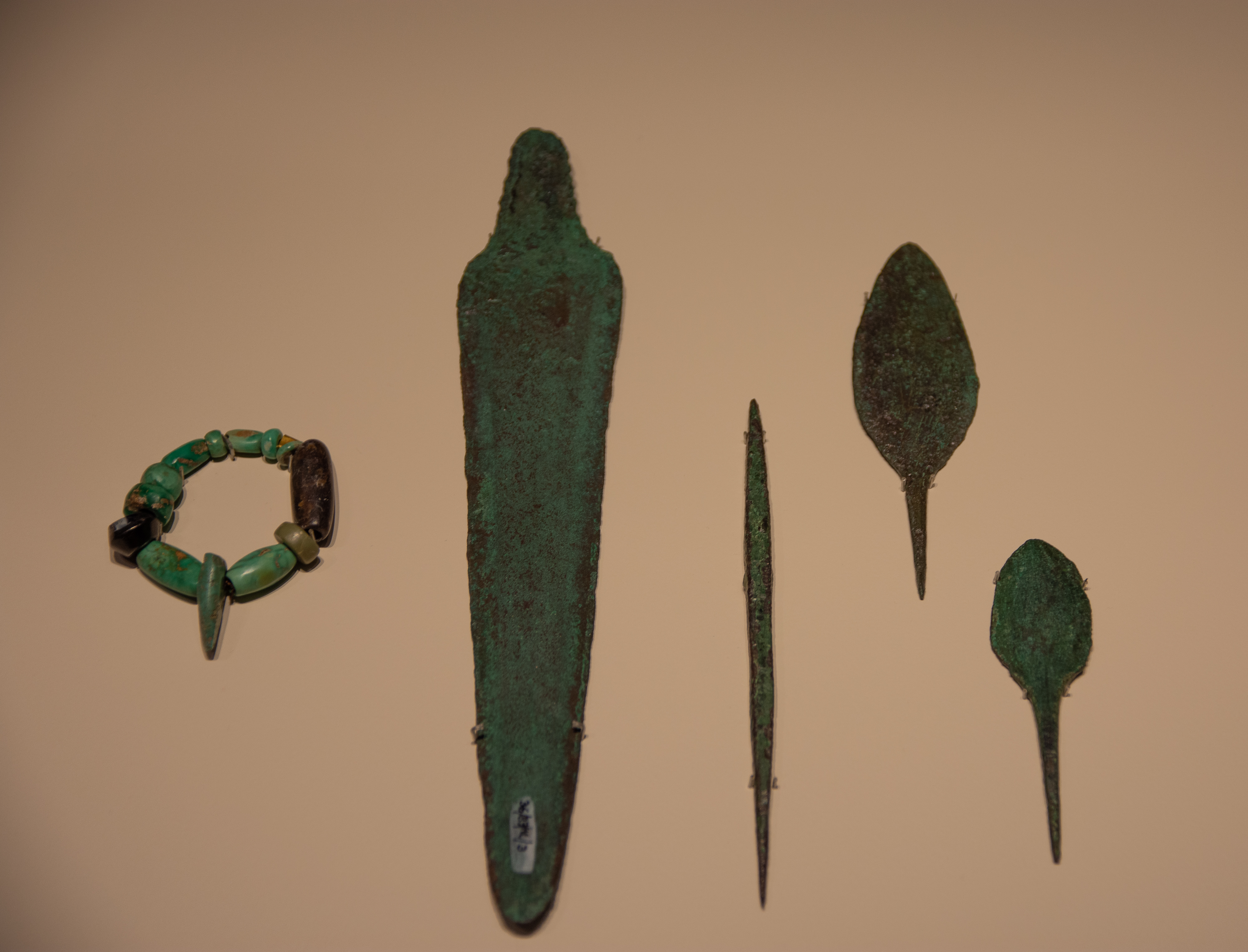
Bracelet, metal dagger, awl and javelin points, Spain

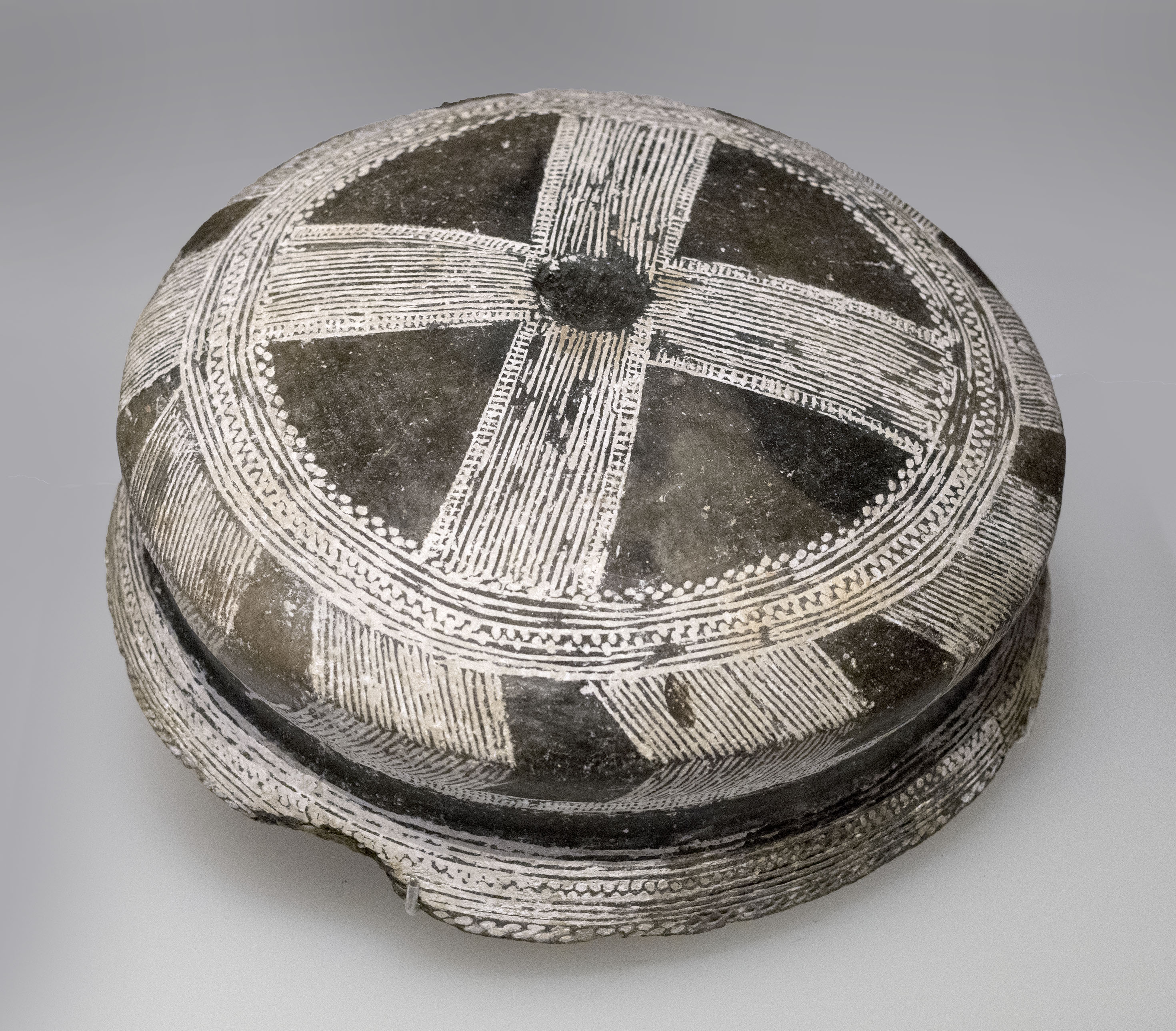
Ceramic dish from Ciempozuelos

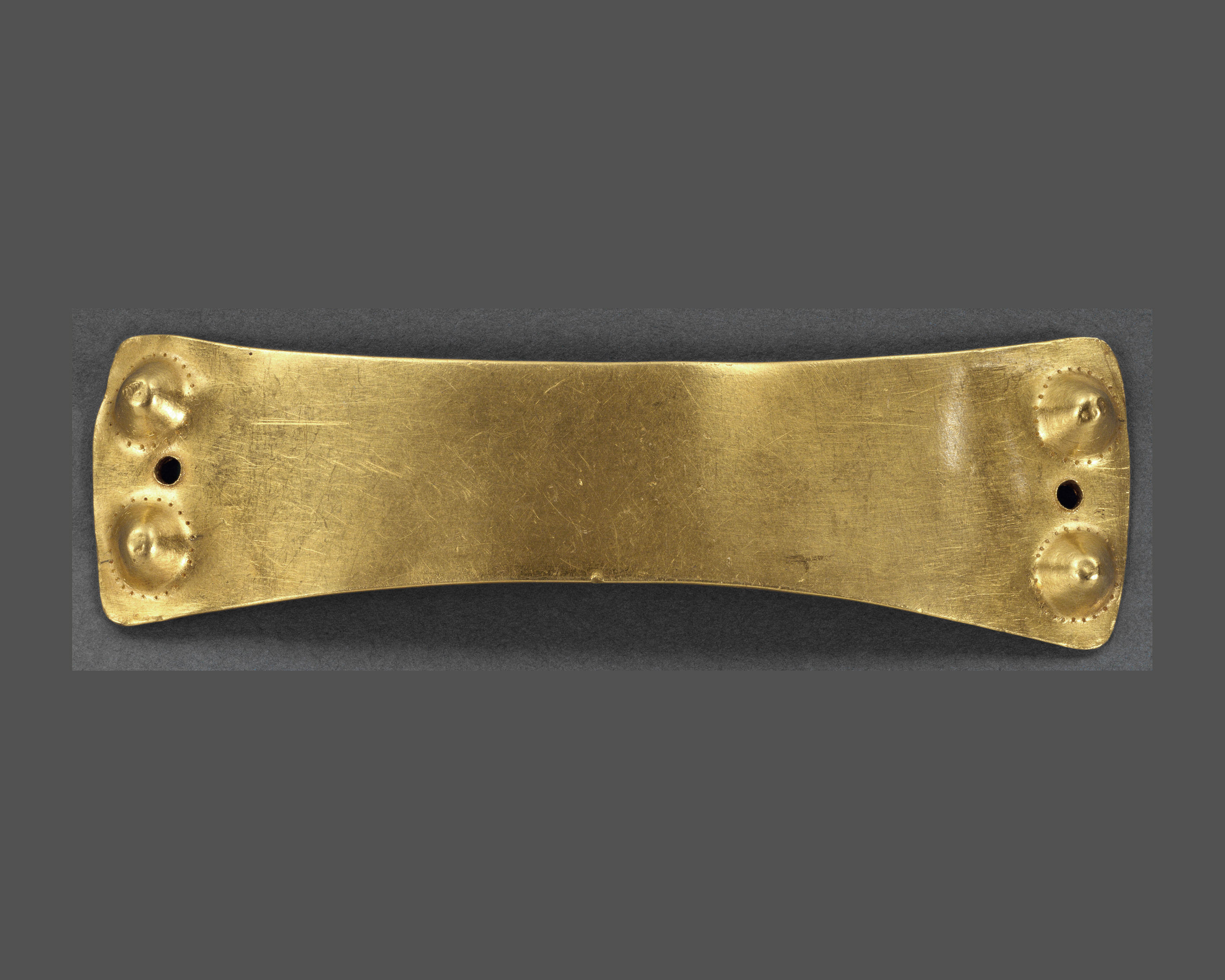
Gold wristguard from Vila Nova de Cerveira, Portugal.

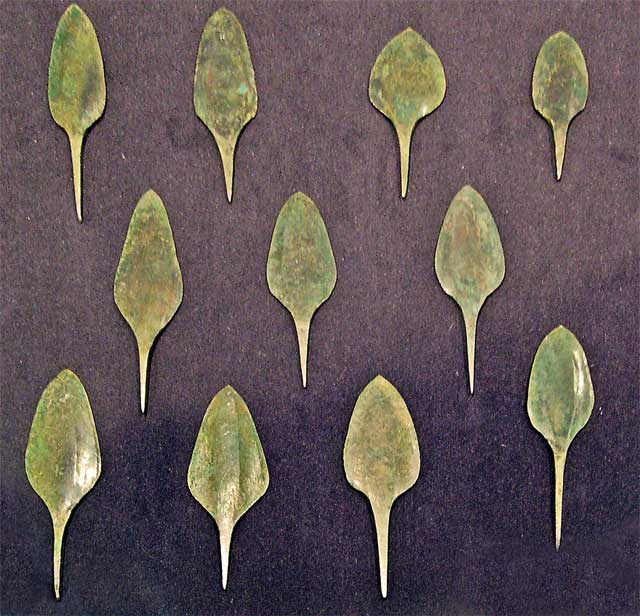
Metal javelin points, Castro of Vila Nova de São Pedro, Portugal

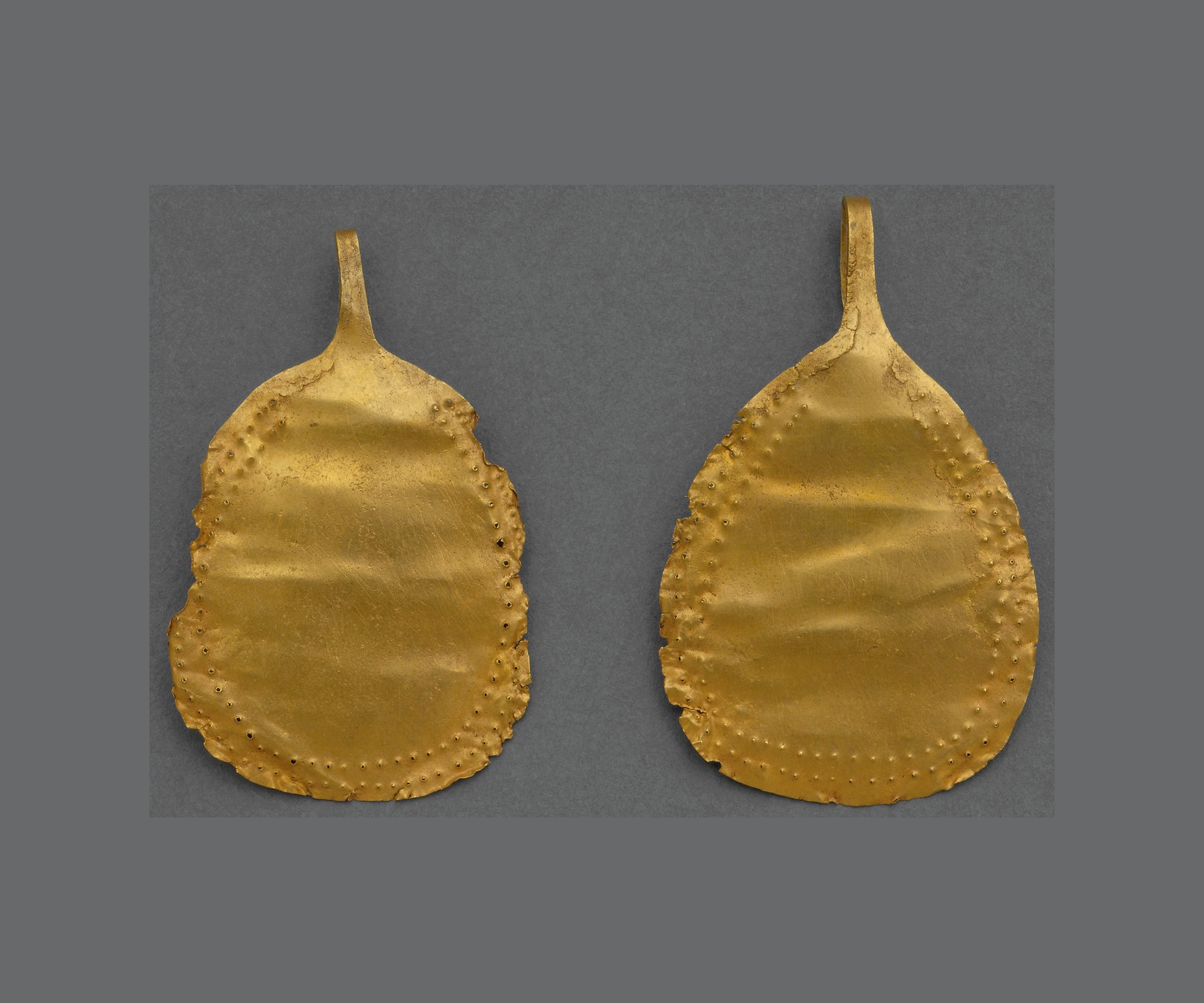
Gold pendants, Portugal

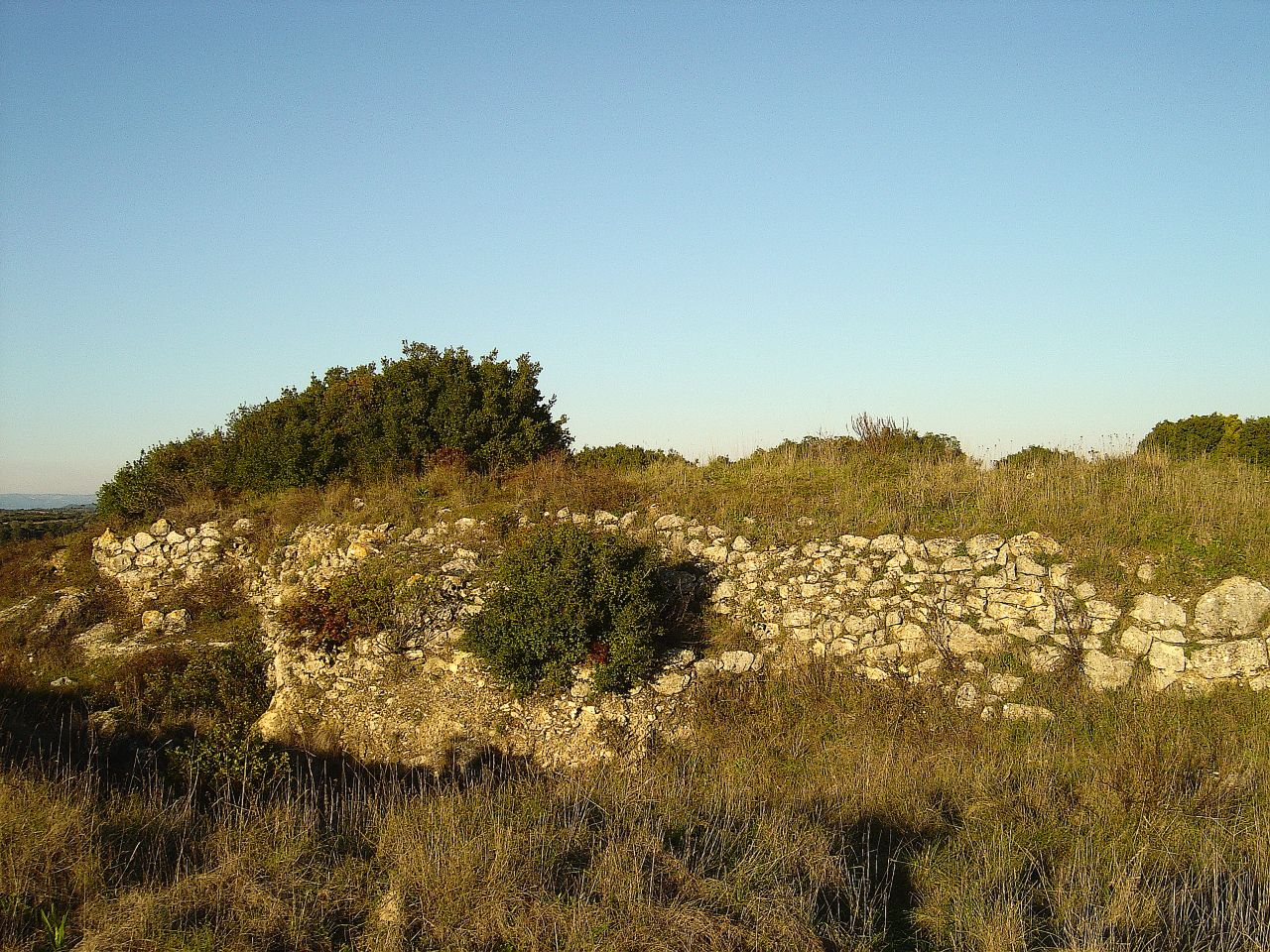
Stone ruins at the Castro of Vila Nova de São Pedro, Portugal

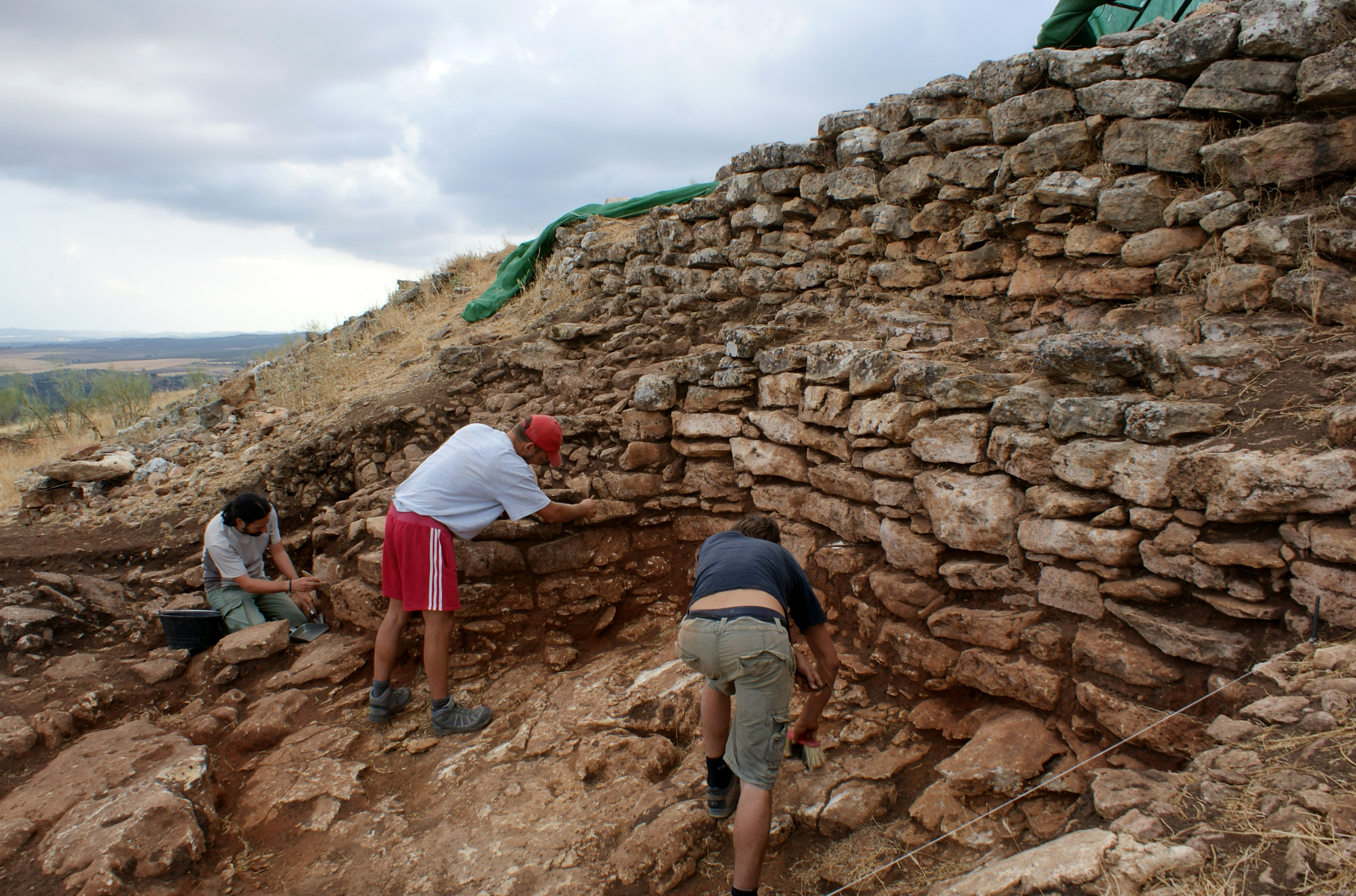
Remains of a fortification wall at Villavieja

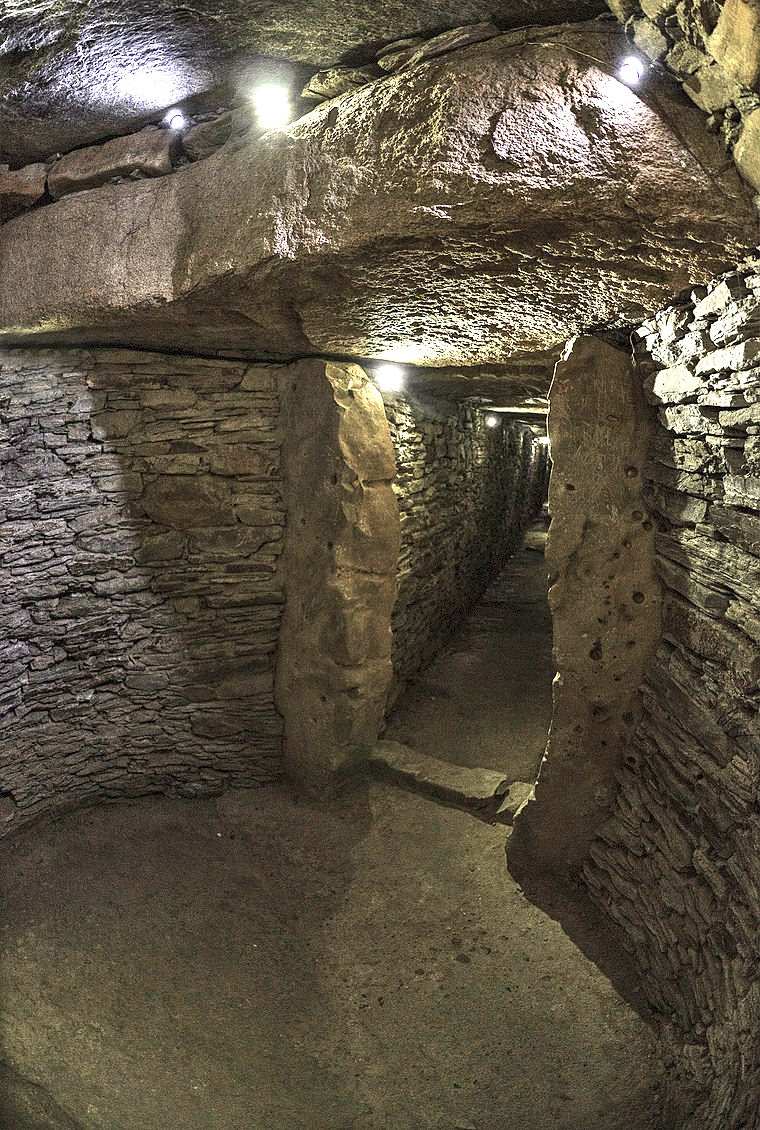
Dolmen de la Pastora, Spain.

=== Balearic Islands ===
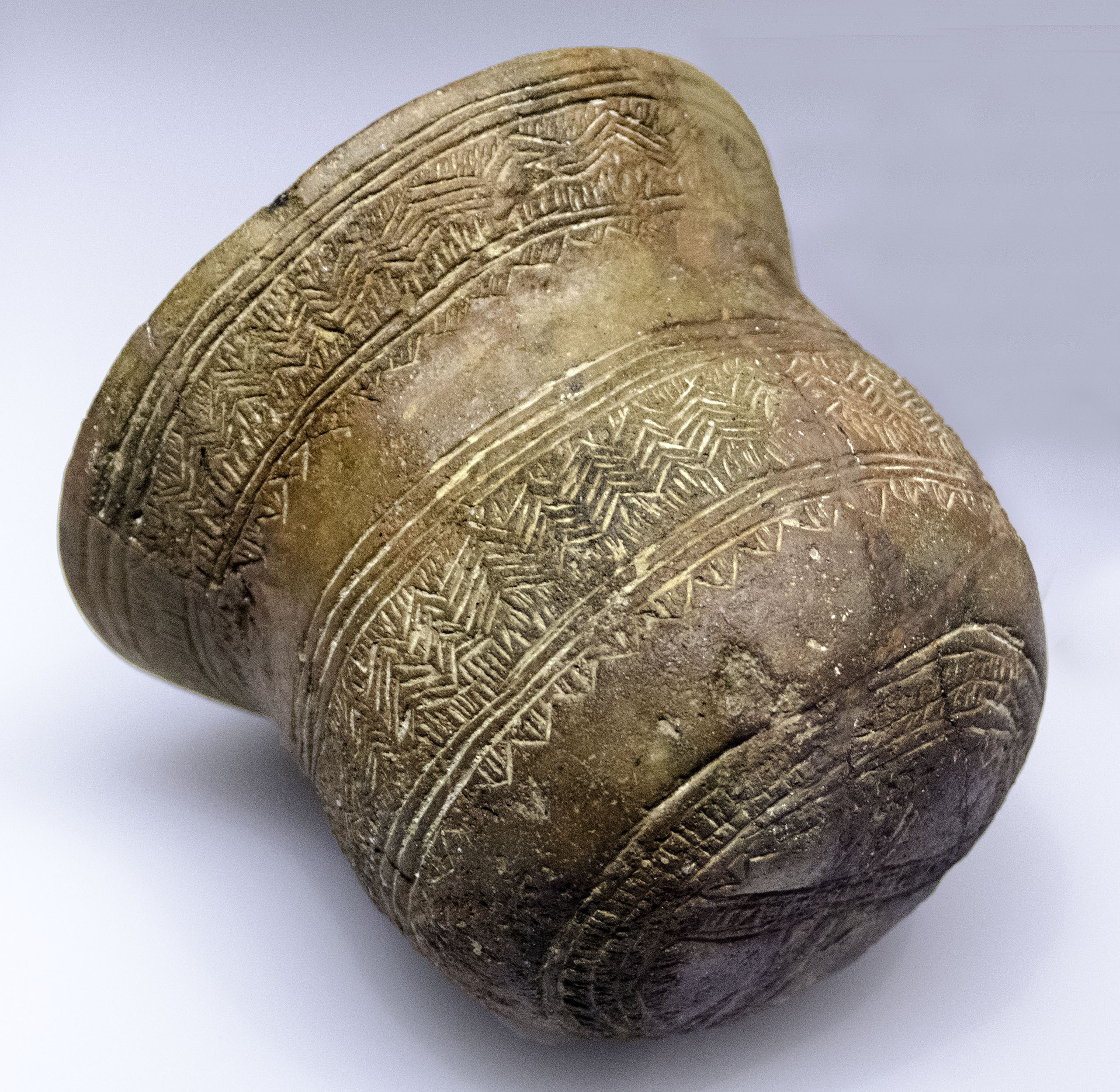
Beaker with Sun cross on the base.

Radiocarbon dating currently indicates a 1,200-year duration for the use of the Beaker pottery on the Balearic Islands, between about 2475 and 1300 BCE. Some evidence exists of all-corded pottery in Mallorca, generally considered the most ancient Bell Beaker pottery, possibly indicating an even earlier Beaker settlement at c. 2700 BCE. However, in several regions, this type of pottery persisted long enough to permit other possibilities. Suárez Otero (1997) postulated this corded Beakers entered the Mediterranean by routes both through the Atlantic coast and eastern France. Bell Beaker pottery has been found in Mallorca and Formentera, but has not been observed in Menorca or Ibiza. Collective burials in dolmen structures in Ibiza could be contrasted against the individual burials in Mallorca. In its latest phase (c.1750–1300 cal BCE) the local Beaker context became associated with the distinctive ornamented Boquique pottery demonstrating clear maritime links with the (megalithic) coastal regions of Catalonia, also assessed to be directly related to the late Cogotas complex. In most of the areas of the mainland, Boquique pottery falls into the latter stages of the Bell Beaker complex, as well. Along with other evidence during the earlier Beaker period in the Balearics, c. 2400–2000 BCE, as shown by the local presence of elephant ivory objects together with significant Beaker pottery and other finds, this maritime interaction can be shown to have a long tradition. The abundance of different cultural elements that persisted towards the end of the Bronze Age, show a clear continuity of different regional and intrusive traditions.

The presence of perforated Beaker pottery, traditionally considered to be used for making cheese, at Son Ferrandell-Oleza and at Coval Simó confirms the introduction of production and conservation of dairy. Also, the presence of spindles at sites like Son Ferrandell-Oleza or Es Velar d'Aprop point to knowledge of making thread and textiles from wool. However, more details on the strategies for tending and slaughtering the domestic animals involved are forthcoming. Being traditionally associated with the introduction of metallurgy, the first traces of copper working in the Balearics were also clearly associated with Bell Beakers.

=== Central Europe ===
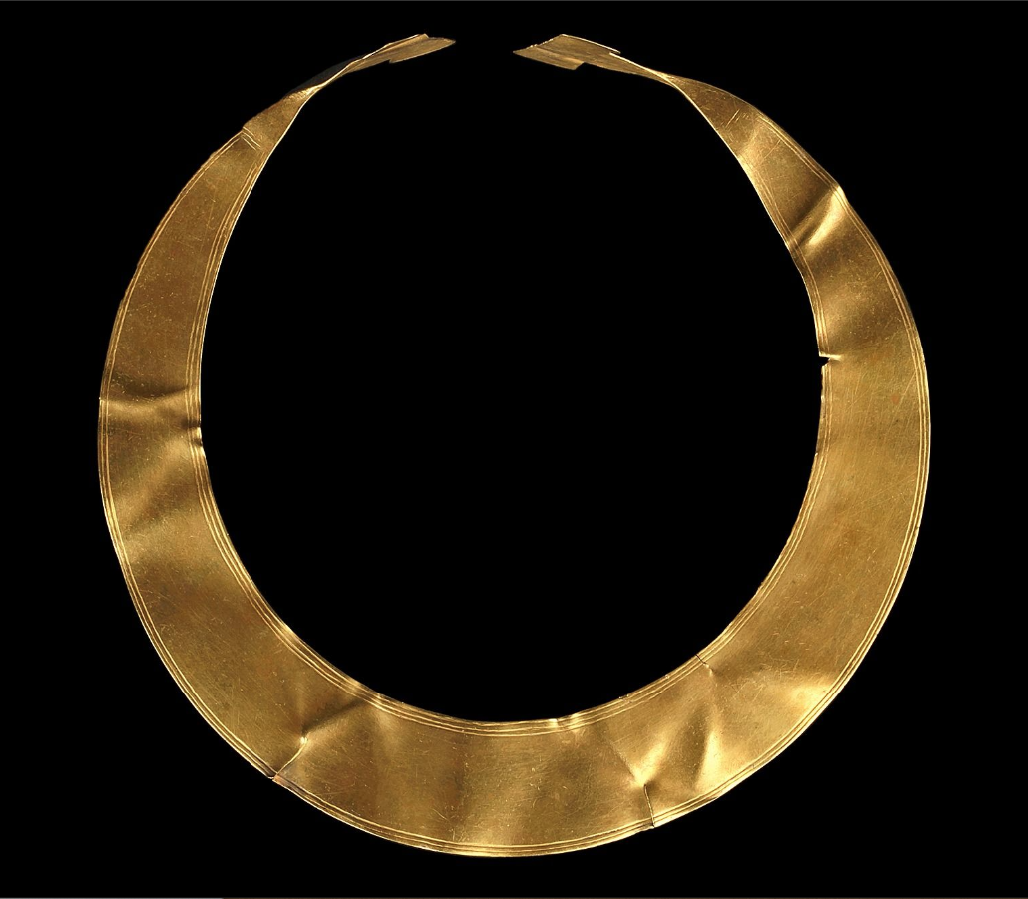
Gold lunula from Lower Saxony, Germany.

In their large-scale study on radiocarbon dating of the Bell Beakers, J. Müller and S. Willingen established that the Bell Beaker Culture in Central Europe started c. 2500 BCE. Two great coexisting and separate Central European cultures – the Corded Ware with its regional groups and the Eastern Group of the Bell Beaker Culture – form the background to the Late Copper Age and Early Bronze Age. The Makó-Kosihy-Čaka culture, indigenous to the Carpathians, may be included as a third component. Their development, diffusion and long-range changes are determined by the great river systems.

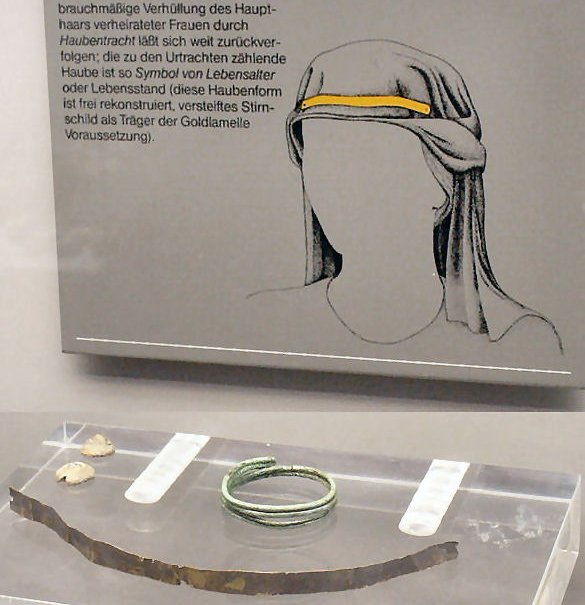
Gold diadem and jewellery, Germany

The Bell Beaker settlements are still little known, and have proved remarkably difficult for archaeologists to identify. This allows a modern view of them to contradict results of anthropologic research. The late 20th century view was that the Bell Beaker people, far from being the "warlike invaders" as once described by Gordon Childe (1940), added rather than replaced local late Neolithic traditions into a cultural package and as such did not always and evenly abandon all local traditions. More recent extensive DNA evidence, however, suggests a significant replacement of earlier populations. A notable example of a well excavated and documented settlement is Albertfalva in Hungary, dating from 2470 to 1950 BCE.

Bell Beaker domestic ware has no predecessors in Bohemia and Southern Germany, shows no genetic relation to the local Late Copper Age Corded Ware, nor to other cultures in the area, and is considered something completely new. The Bell Beaker domestic ware of Southern Germany is not as closely related to the Corded Ware as would be indicated by their burial rites. Settlements link the Southern German Bell Beaker culture to the seven regional provinces of the Eastern Group, represented by many settlement traces, especially from Moravia and the Hungarian Bell Beaker-Csepel group being the most important. In 2002, one of the largest Bell Beaker cemeteries in Central Europe was discovered at Hoštice za Hanou (Moravia, Czech Republic).

The relationship to the western Bell Beakers groups, and the contemporary cultures of the Carpathian basin to the south east, is much less. Research in northern Poland shifted the north-eastern frontier of this complex to the western parts of the Baltic with the adjacent Northern European plain. Typical Bell Beaker fragments from the site of Ostrikovac-Djura at the Serbian river Morava were presented at the Riva del Garda conference in 1998, some 100 km south-east of the Csepel Beaker sub-group (modern Hungary). Bell Beaker related material has now been uncovered in a line from the Baltic Sea down to the Adriatic and the Ionian Sea, including the modern states comprising Belarus, Poland, Romania, Serbia, Montenegro, Croatia, Albania, North Macedonia and parts of Greece.

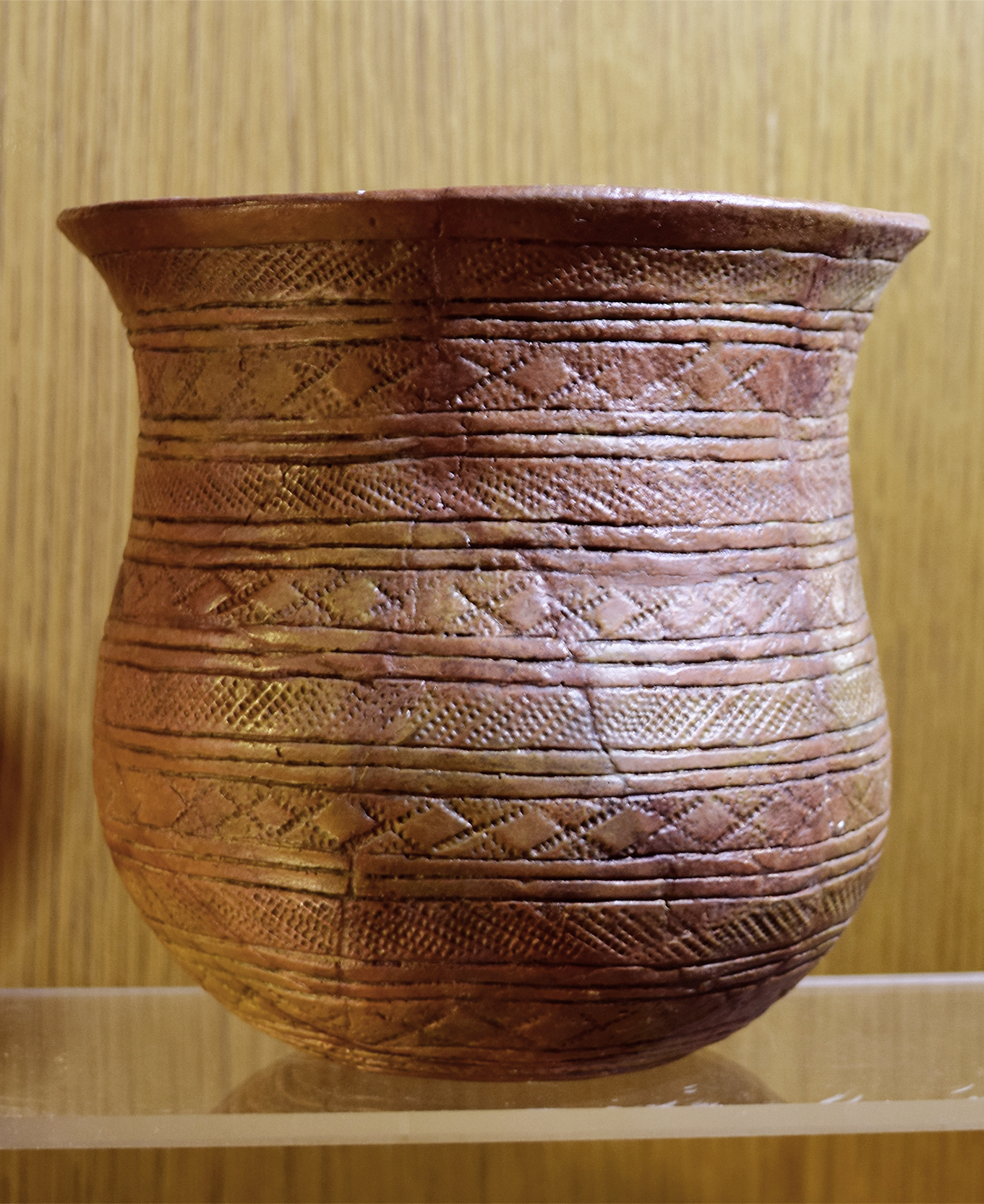
Bell Beaker, Austria

The Bell Beaker culture settlements in southern Germany and in the East-Group show evidence of mixed farming and animal husbandry, and indicators such as millstones and spindle whorls prove the sedentary character of the Bell Beaker people, and the durability of their settlements. Some especially well equipped child-burials seem to indicate sense of predestined social position, indicating a socially complex society. However, analysis of grave furnishing, position within the cemetery, and size and deepness of grave pits did not lead to any strong conclusions on the social divisions.

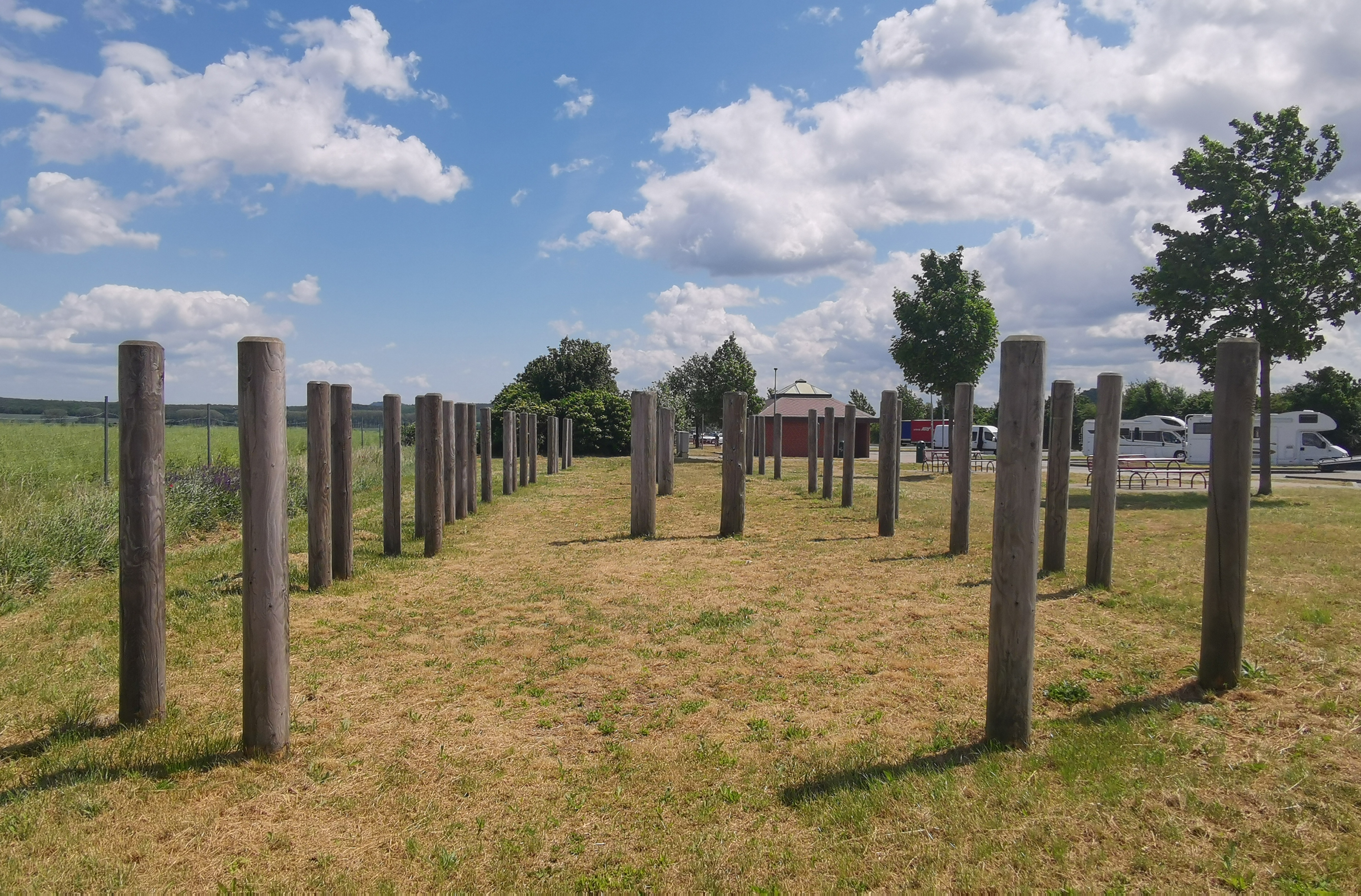
Outline of an Early Bronze Age longhouse, Benzingerode (Harz mountains), Germany

The Late Copper Age is regarded as a continuous culture system connecting the Upper Rhine valley to the western edge of the Carpathian Basin. Late Copper Age 1 was defined in southern Germany by the connection of the late Cham Culture, Globular Amphora culture, and the older Corded Ware Culture of "beaker group 1" that is also referred to as Horizon A or Step A. Early Bell Beaker Culture intruded into the region at the end of the Late Copper Age 1, around 2600–2550 BCE. Middle Bell Beaker corresponds to Late Copper Age 2 and here an east–west Bell Beaker cultural gradient became visible through the difference in the distribution of the groups of beakers with and without handles, cups and bowls, in the three regions Austria–Western Hungary, the Danube catchment area of Southern Germany, and the Upper Rhine/lake Constance/Eastern Switzerland area for all subsequent Bell Beaker periods. This middle Bell Beaker Culture is the main period when almost all the cemeteries in Southern Germany begin. Younger Bell Beaker Culture of Early Bronze Age shows analogies to the Proto-Únětice Culture in Moravia and the Early Nagyrév Culture of the Carpathian Basin.

During the Bell Beaker period, a border ran through southern Germany, which culturally divided a northern from a southern area. The northern area was oriented around the Rhine and the Bell Beaker West Group, while the southern area occupied much of the Danube river system and was mainly settled by the homogeneous Bell Beaker East Group. This latter group overlapped with the Corded Ware Culture and other groups of the Late Neolithic and early Bronze Age. Nevertheless, southern Germany shows some independent developments of itself.

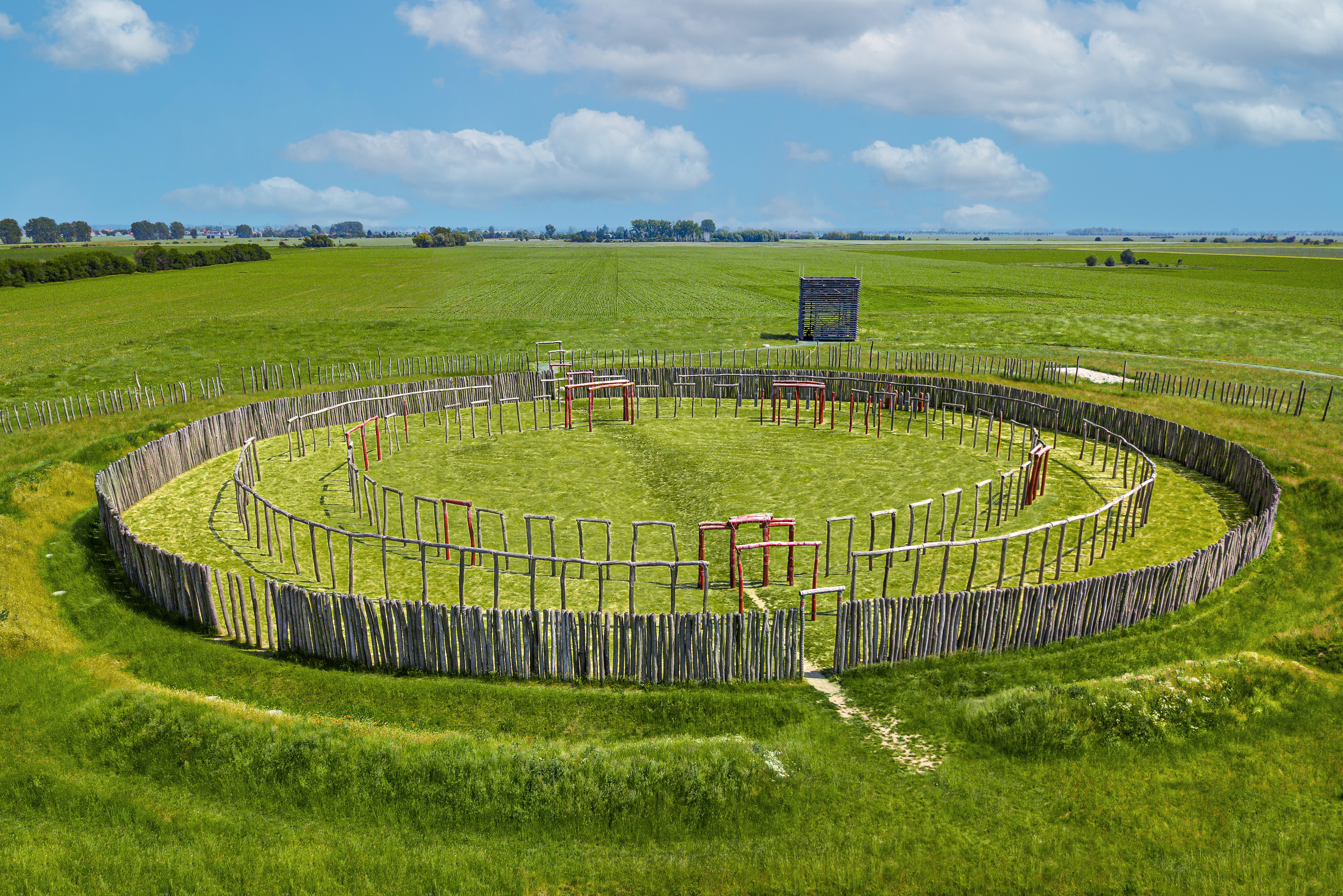
Pömmelte circular enclosure, Germany, c. 2300 BCE.

Although a broadly parallel evolution with early, middle, and younger Bell Beaker Culture was detected, the Southern Germany middle Bell Beaker development of metope decorations and stamp and furrow engraving techniques do not appear on beakers in Austria-Western Hungary, and handled beakers are completely absent. It is contemporary to Corded Ware in the vicinity, that has been attested by associated finds of middle Corded Ware (chronologically referred to as "beaker group 2" or Step B) and younger Geiselgasteig Corded Ware beakers ("beaker group 3" or Step C). Bell Beaker Culture in Bavaria used a specific type of copper, which is characterised by combinations of trace elements. This same type of copper was spread over the area of the Bell Beaker East Group.

Previously some archaeologists considered the Bell-beaker people to have lived only within a limited territory of the Carpathian Basin and for a short time, without mixing with the local population. Although there are very few evaluable anthropological finds, the appearance of the characteristic planoccipital (flattened back) Taurid type in the populations of some later cultures (e.g. Kisapostag and Gáta–Wieselburg cultures) suggested a mixture with the local population contradicting such archaeological theories. According to archaeology, the populational groups of the Bell-beakers also took part in the formation of the Gáta-Wieselburg culture on the western fringes of the Carpathian Basin, which could be confirmed with the anthropological Bell Beaker series in Moravia and Germany. In accordance with anthropological evidence, it has been concluded the Bell Beakers intruded in an already established form the southern part of Germany as much as the East Group area.

Around 2300 BCE, large circular enclosures were built at Pömmelte and nearby Schönebeck in central Germany. These were important ritual sites which remained in use until c. 1900 BCE. The main entrances of the Pömmelte enclosure were oriented towards sunrise and sunset midway between the solstices and equinoxes, indicating that Pömmelte served as a monument for "ceremonies linked to calendrical rites and seasonal feasting". The Pömmelte and Schönebeck enclosures formed parts of a 'sacral landscape' with origins in an early 3rd millennium BCE sanctuary and elite burial of the Corded Ware culture. The Pömmelte enclosure also has an almost identical diameter and a similar ground plan to Stonehenge in England. According to excavators the two monuments were built by "the same culture" with "the same view of the world". The largest known Early Bronze Age settlement in central Europe was built next to the Pömmelte enclosure, belonging to the early phase of the Únětice culture. The remains of 130 large timber houses have been found on the site; they were typically 20 metres in length with some up to 30.5 metres in length, and with floor areas ranging from 80 m^{2} to 360 m^{2}.

A timber henge-like ritual structure has also been excavated at Poysbrunn in Lower Austria.

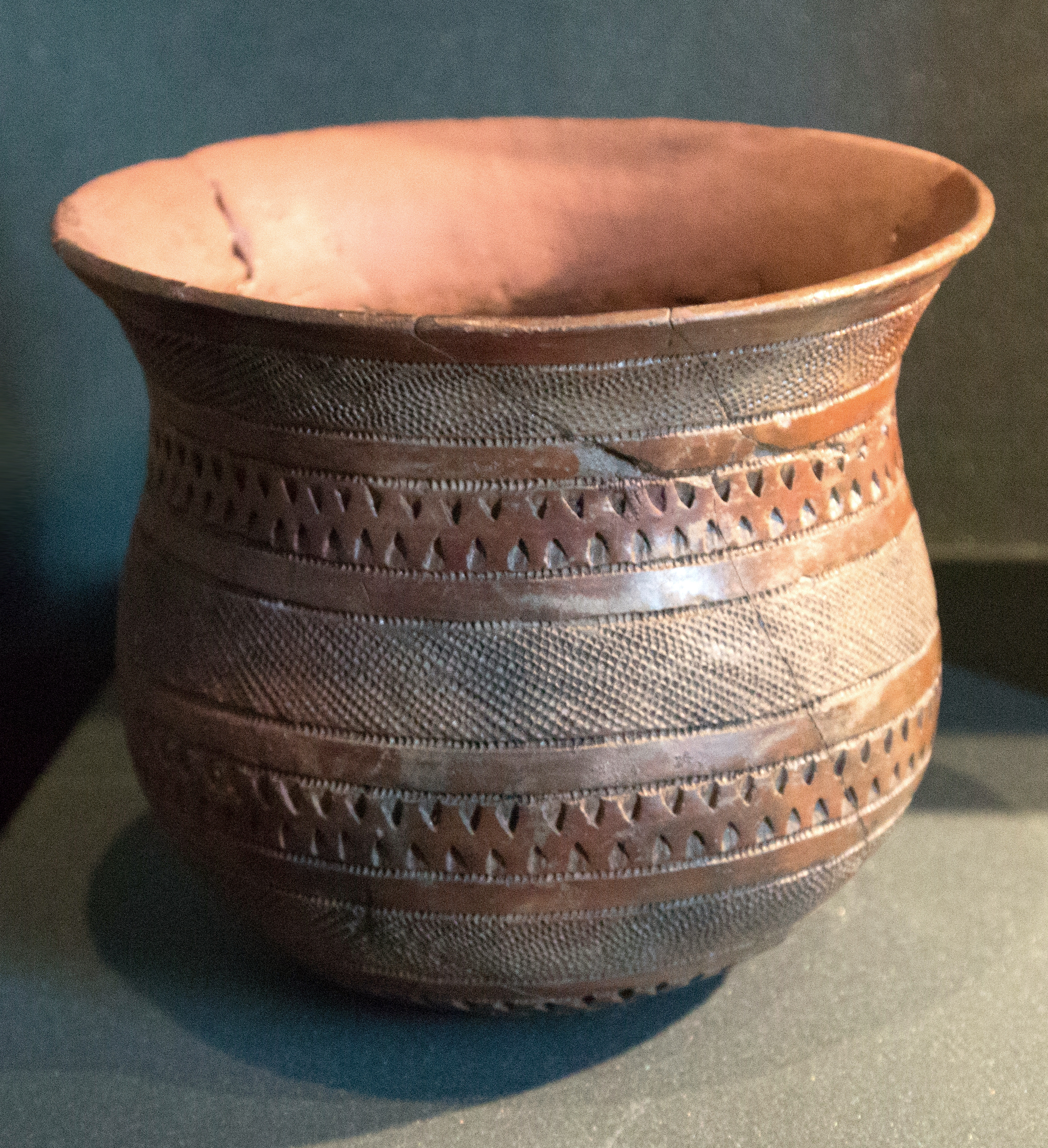
Bell Beaker from the Czech Republic

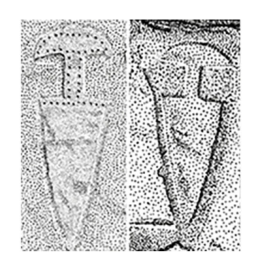
Dagger carving from Le Petit-Chasseur, Switzerland

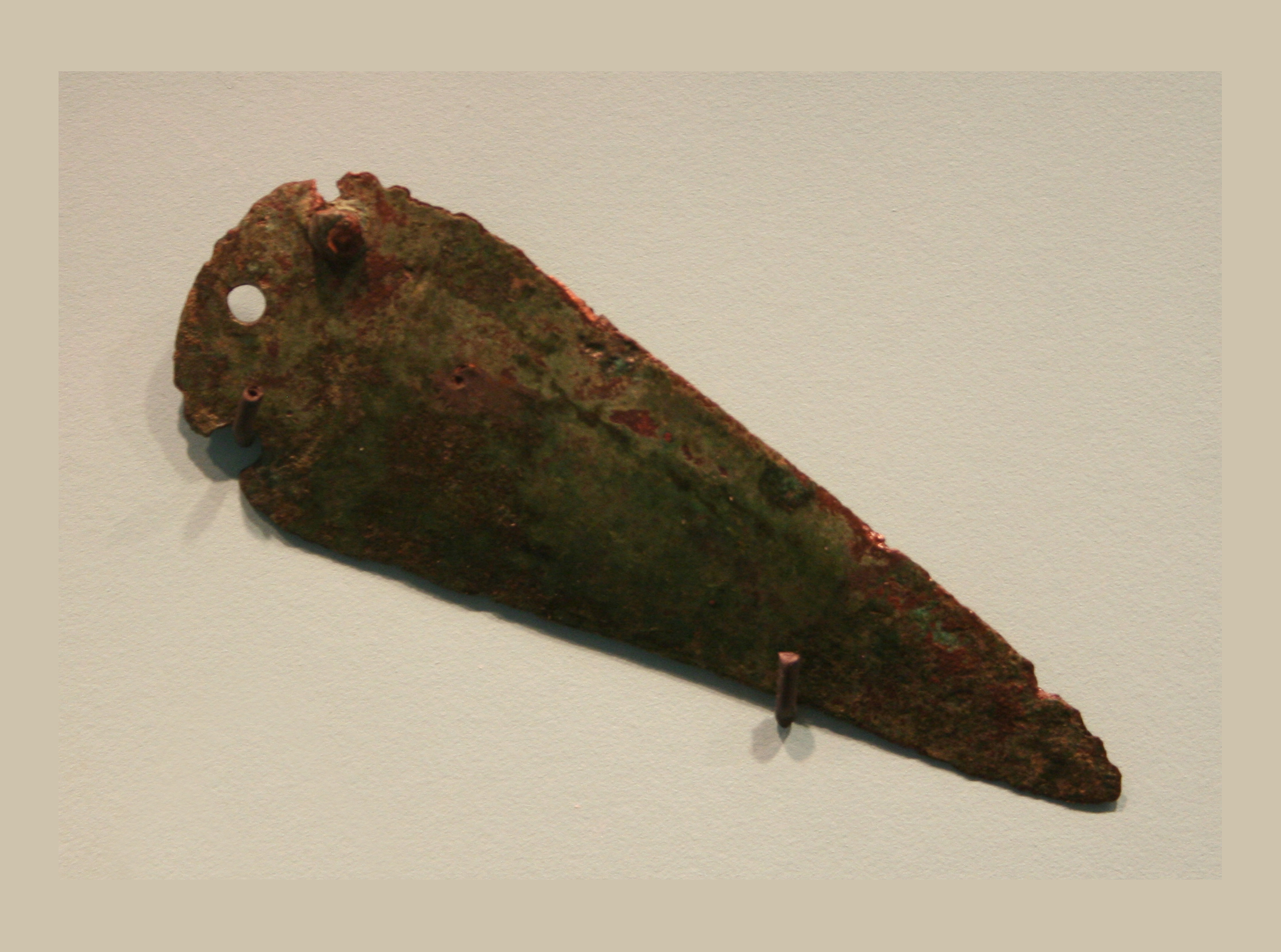
Metal dagger from Brandenburg, Germany.

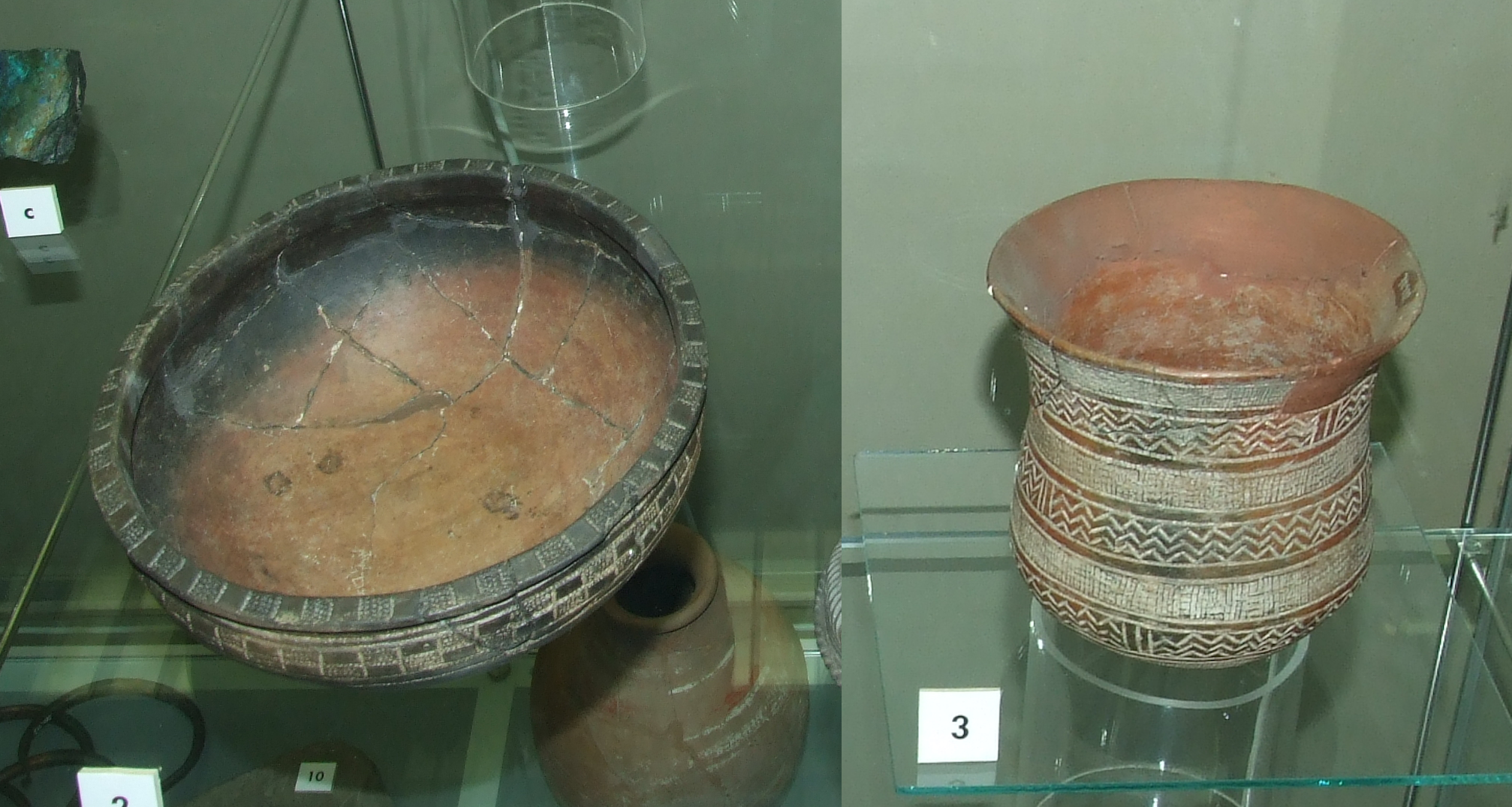
Ceramics from Bohemia, Moravia and Slovakia

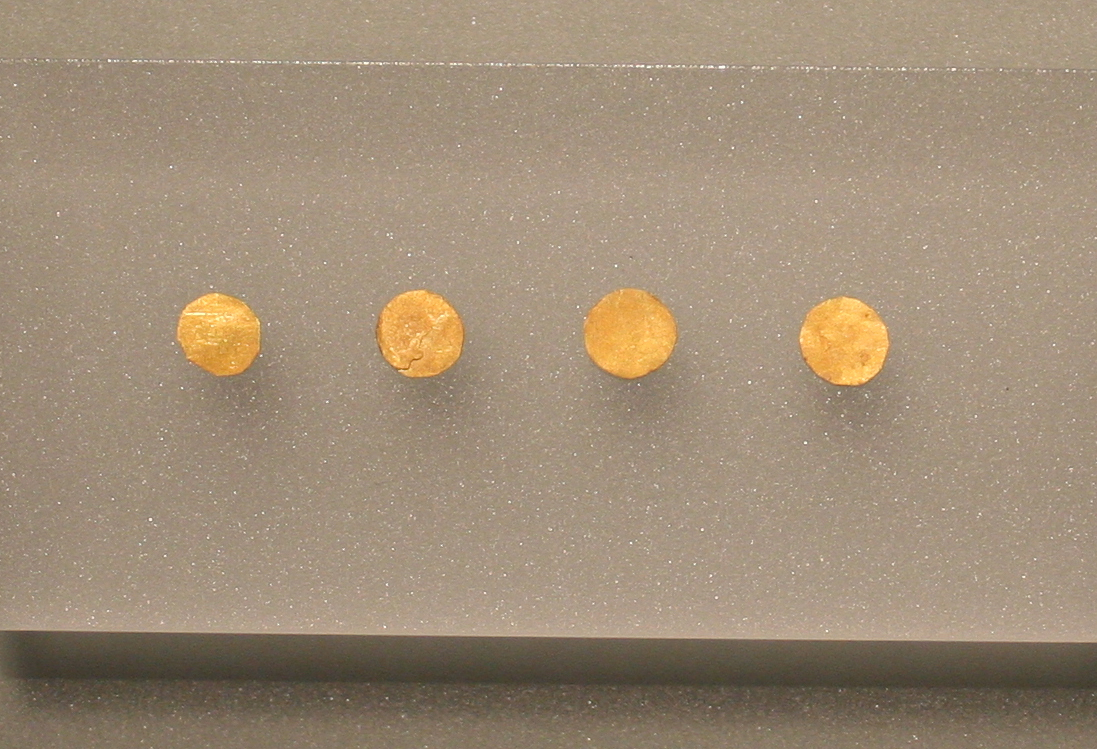
Gold discs from Eythra, Germany

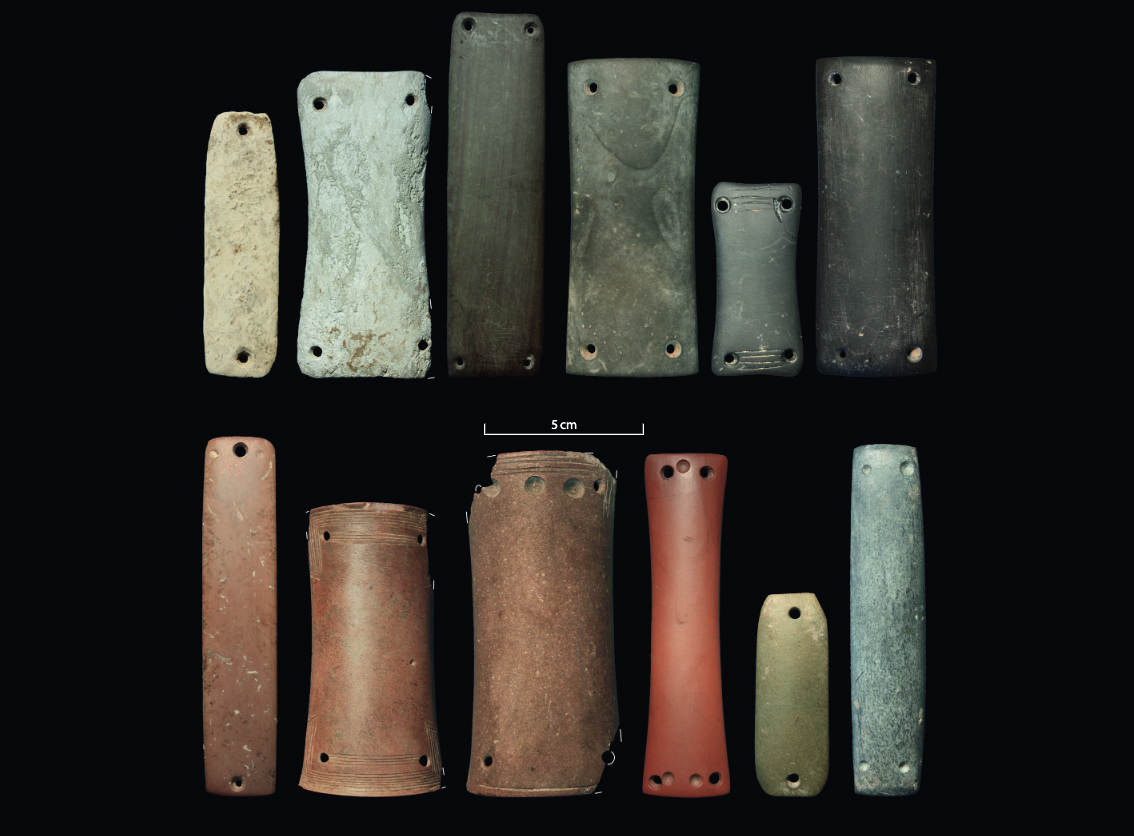
Stone wrist-guards from Central Europe

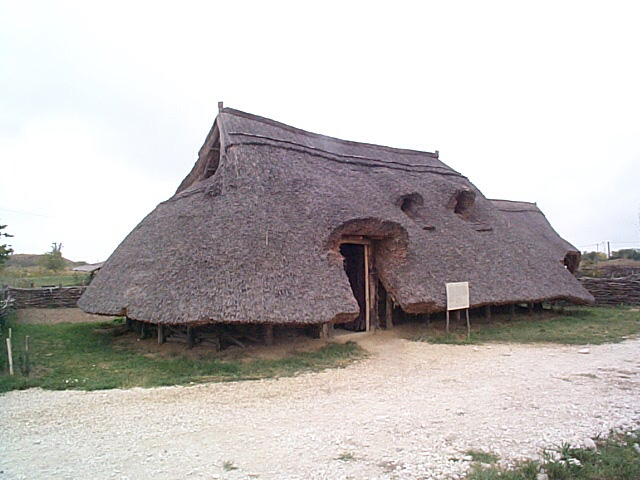
House reconstruction, Csepel group, Hungary.

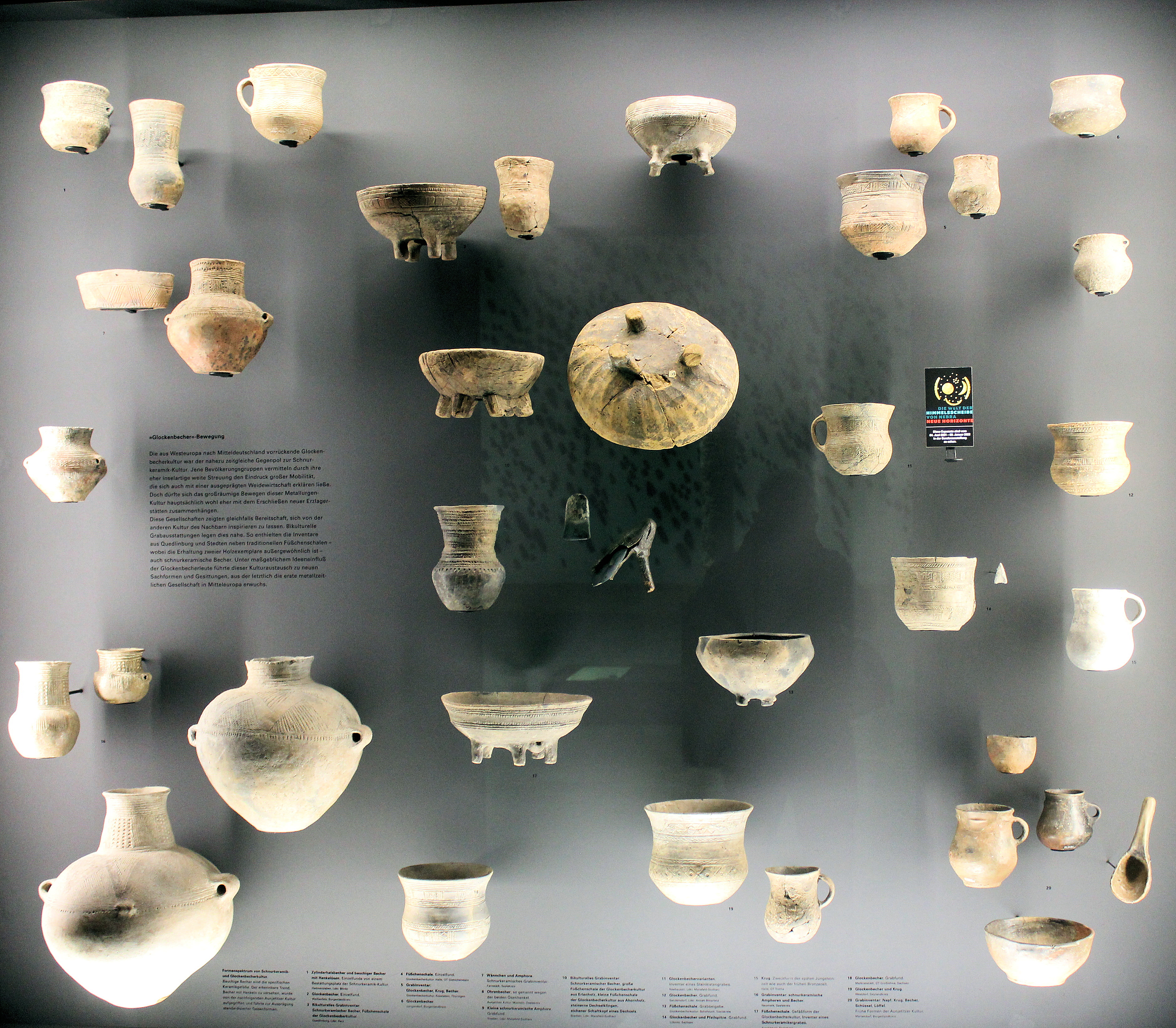
Pottery and implements, Germany

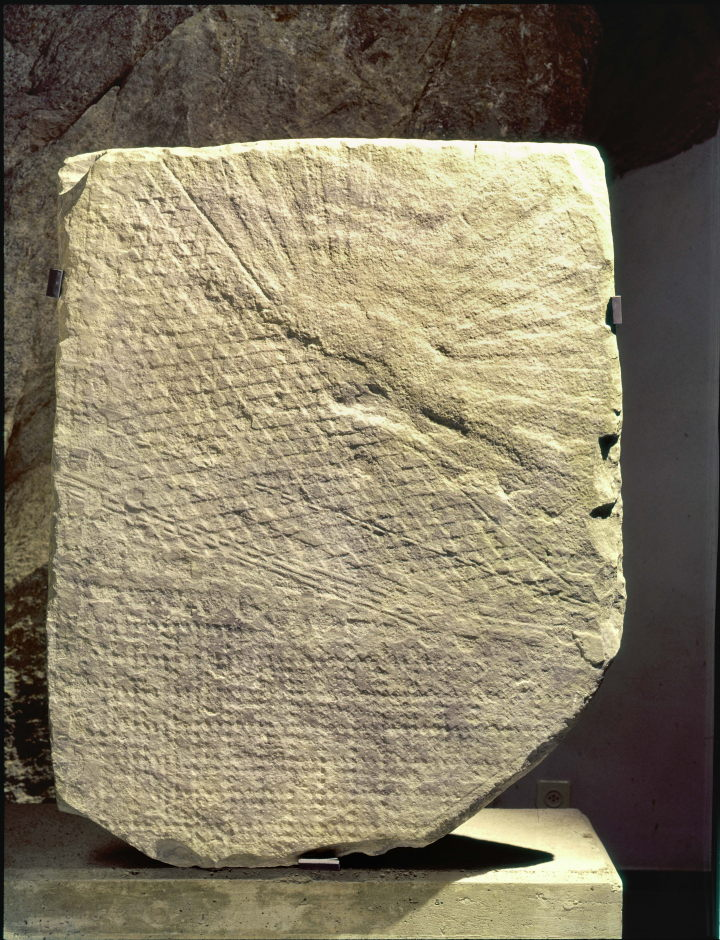
Stone stele, Switzerland

=== Ireland ===
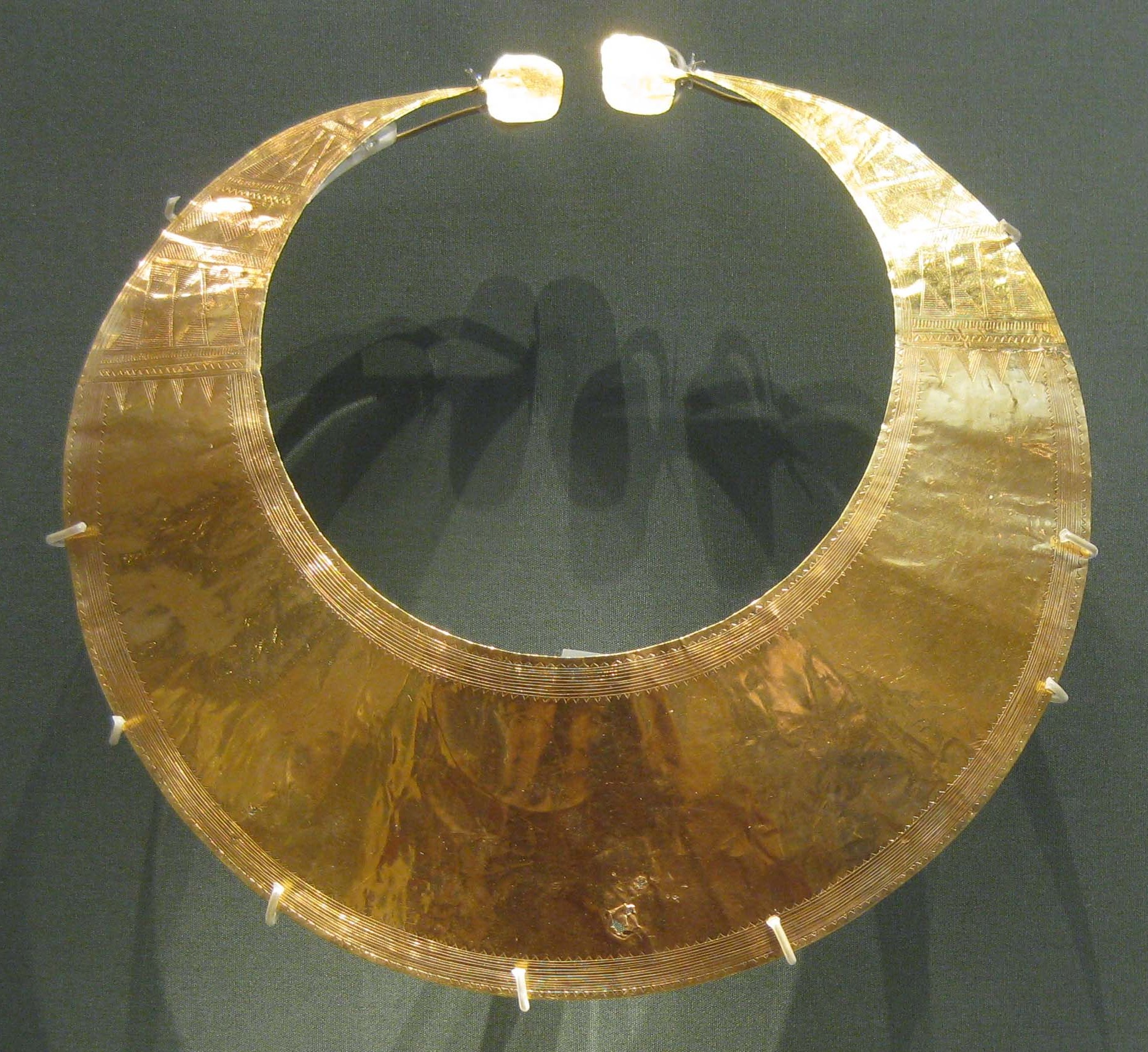
Gold lunula from Blessington, c. 2400 BCE

Beakers arrived in Ireland c. 2500 BCE and fell out of use c. 1700 BCE. The beaker pottery of Ireland was rarely used as a grave good, but is often found in domestic assemblages from the period. This stands in contrast to the rest of Europe where it is frequently found in both roles. The inhabitants of Ireland used food vessels as a grave good instead. The large, communal passage tombs of the Irish Neolithic were no longer being constructed during the Early Bronze Age (although some, such as Newgrange were re-used). The preferred method of burial seems to have been single graves and cists in the east, or in small wedge tombs in the west. Cremation was also common.

The advent of the Bronze Age Beaker culture in Ireland is accompanied by the destruction of smaller satellite tombs at Knowth and collapses of the great cairn at Newgrange, marking an end to the Neolithic culture of megalithic passage tombs.

Beakers are found in large numbers in Ireland, and the technical innovation of ring-built pottery indicates that the makers were also present. Classification of pottery in Ireland and Britain has distinguished a total of seven intrusive beaker groups originating from the continent and three groups of purely insular character having evolved from them. Five out of seven of the intrusive Beaker groups also appear in Ireland: the European bell group, the All-over cord beakers, the Scottish/North Rhine beakers, the Northern British/Middle Rhine beakers and the Wessex/Middle Rhine beakers. However, many of the features or innovations of Beaker society in Britain never reached Ireland. Instead, quite different customs predominated in the Irish record that were apparently influenced by the traditions of the earlier inhabitants. Some features that are found elsewhere in association to later types of Earlier Bronze Age Beaker pottery, indeed spread to Ireland, however, without being incorporated into the same close and specific association of Irish Beaker context. The Wessex/Middle Rhine gold discs bearing "wheel and cross" motifs that were probably sewn to garments, presumably to indicate status and reminiscent of racquet headed pins found in Eastern Europe, enjoy a general distribution throughout the country, however, never in direct association with beakers.

In 1984, a Beaker period copper dagger blade was recovered from the Sillees River near Ross Lough, County Fermanagh, Northern Ireland. The flat, triangular-shaped copper blade was 171 mm (6.73 in) long, with bevelled edges and a pointed tip, and featured an integral tang that accepted a riveted handle. Flint arrow-heads and copper-blade daggers with handle tangs, found in association with Beaker pottery in many other parts of Europe, have a date later than the initial phase of Beaker People activity in Ireland. Also the typical Beaker wristguards seem to have entered Ireland by cultural diffusion only, after the first intrusions, and unlike English and Continental Beaker burials never made it to the graves. The same lack of typical Beaker association applies to the about thirty found stone battle axes. A gold ornament found in County Down that closely resembles a pair of ear-rings from Ermegeira, Portugal, has a composition that suggests it was imported. Incidental finds suggest links to non-British Beaker territories, like a fragment of a bronze blade in County Londonderry that has been likened to the "palmella" points of Iberia, even though the relative scarcity of beakers, and Beaker-compatible material of any kind, in the south-west are regarded as an obstacle to any colonisation directly from Iberia, or even from France. Their greater concentration in the northern part of the country, which traditionally is regarded as the part of Ireland least blessed with sources of copper, has led many authorities to question the role of Beaker People in the introduction of metallurgy to Ireland. However, indications of their use of stream sediment copper, low in traces of lead and arsenic, and Beaker finds connected to mining and metalworking at Ross Island, County Kerry, provide an escape to such doubts.

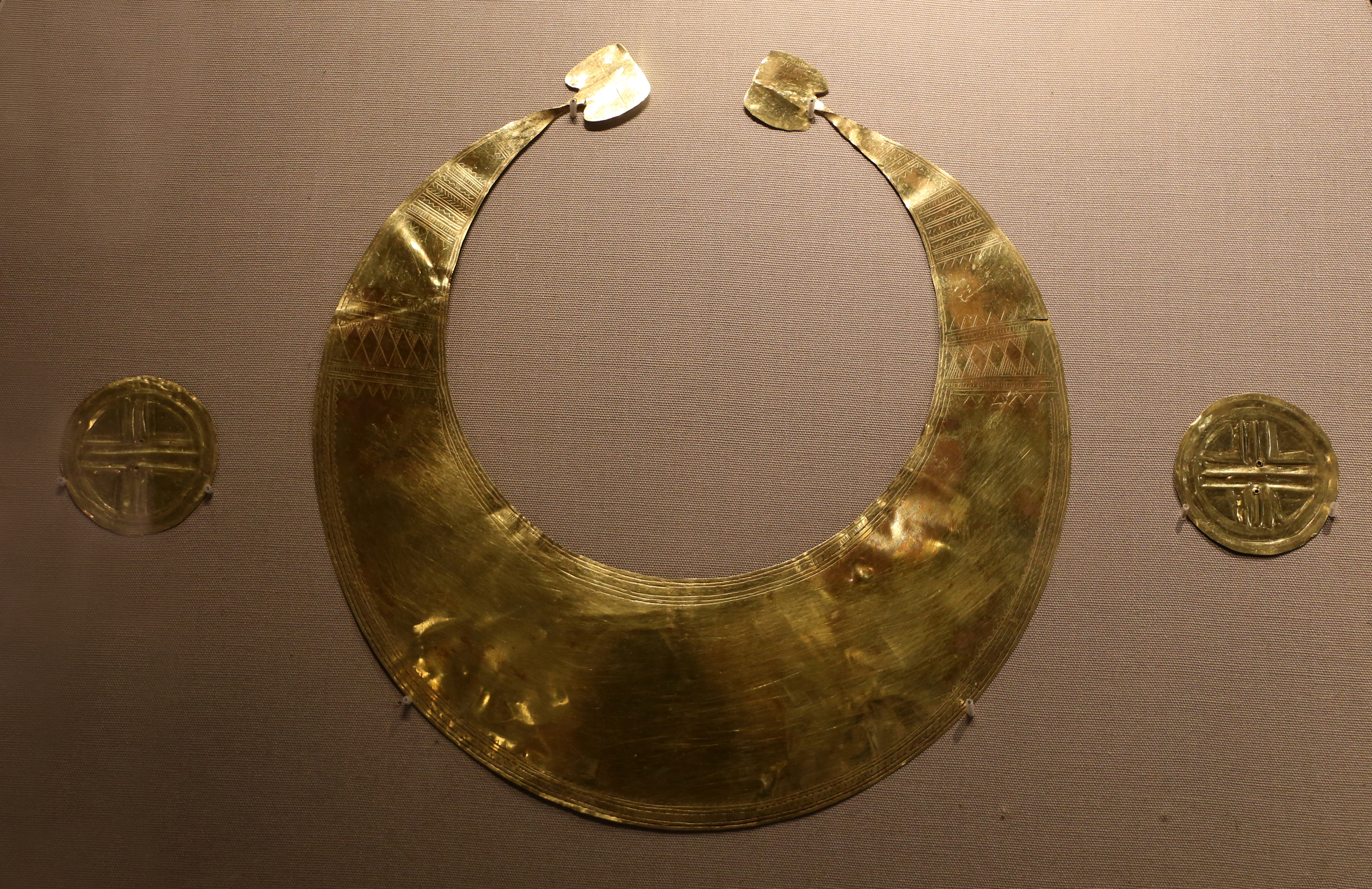
Gold lunula and discs from Coggalbeg, Ireland, c. 2300 BCE.

The featured "food vessels" and cinerary urns (encrusted, collared and cordoned) of the Irish Earlier Bronze Age have strong roots in the western European Beaker tradition. Recently, the concept of these food vessels was discarded and replaced by a concept of two different traditions that rely on typology: the bowl tradition and the vase tradition, the bowl tradition being the oldest as it has been found inserted in existing Neolithic (pre-beaker) tombs, both court tombs and passage tombs. The bowl tradition occurs over the whole country except the south-west and feature a majority of pit graves, both in flat cemeteries and mounds, and a high incidence of uncremated skeletons, often in crouched position. The vase tradition has a general distribution and feature almost exclusively cremation. The flexed skeleton of a man 1.88 meters tall in a cist in a slightly oval round cairn with "food vessel" at Cornaclery, County Londonderry, was described in the 1942 excavation report as "typifying the race of Beaker Folk", although the differences between Irish finds and e.g. the British combination of "round barrows with crouched, unburnt burials" make it difficult to establishes the exact nature of the Beaker People's colonization of Ireland.

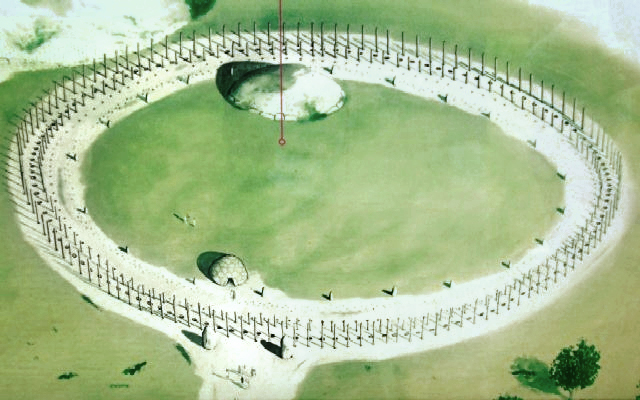
Illustration of timber circle at Newgrange, Ireland, c. 2000 BCE

In general, the early Irish Beaker intrusions do not attest the overall "Beaker package" of innovations that, once fully developed, swept Europe elsewhere, leaving Ireland behind. The Irish Beaker period is characterised by the earliness of Beaker intrusions, by isolation and by influences and surviving traditions of autochthons.

Beaker culture introduces the practice of burial in single graves, suggesting an Earlier Bronze Age social organisation of family groups. Towards the Later Bronze Age the sites move to potentially fortifiable hilltops, suggesting a more "clan"-type structure. Although the typical Bell Beaker practice of crouched burial has been observed, cremation was readily adopted in accordance with the previous tradition of the autochthons. In a tumulus the find of the extended skeleton of a woman accompanied by the remains of a red deer and a small seven-year-old stallion is noteworthy, including the hint to a Diana-like religion. A few burials seem to indicate social status, though in other contexts an emphasis to special skills is more likely.

One of the most important sites in Ireland during the Beaker period is Ross Island. A series of copper mines from here are the earliest known in Ireland, starting from c. 2500 BCE (O'Brien 2004). A comparison of chemical traces and lead isotope analysis from these mines with copper artefacts strongly suggests that Ross Island was the sole source of copper in Ireland between the dates 2500–2200 BCE. In addition, two thirds of copper artefacts from Britain also display the same chemical and isotopic signature, strongly suggesting that Irish copper was a major export to Britain. Traces of Ross Island copper can be found even further afield; in the Netherlands it makes up 12% of analysed copper artefacts, and Brittany 6% of analysed copper artefacts After 2200 BCE there is greater chemical variation in British and Irish copper artefacts, which tallies well with the appearance of other mines in southern Ireland and north Wales. After 2000 BCE, other copper sources supersede Ross Island. The latest workings from the Ross Island mines is dated to around 1700 BCE.

Reconstruction of a halberd from Carn.

As well as exporting raw copper/bronze, there were some technical and cultural developments in Ireland that had an important impact on other areas of Europe. Irish food vessels were adopted in northern Britain in c. 2200 BCE and this roughly coincides with a decline in the use of beakers in Britain. The 'bronze halberd' (not to be confused with the medieval halberd) was a weapon in use in Ireland from c.2400–2000 BCE. They are essentially broad blades that were mounted horizontally on a meter long handle, giving greater reach and impact than any known contemporary weapon. They were subsequently widely adopted in other parts of Europe, possibly showing a change in the technology of warfare.

==== Solar symbolism ====
Ireland has the greatest concentration of gold lunulae and stone wrist-guards in Europe. However, neither of these items were deposited in graves and they tend to be found isolated and at random.

In some cases gold lunulae have been found with pairs of gold discs, e.g. at Coggalbeg in Ireland and Cabeceiras de Basto in Portugal. Both lunulae and discs have been linked to sun worship. The archaeologist Mary Cahill connects them to a "great solar cult" stretching across western and central Europe to Scandinavia. Cahill suggests that the central part of the lunulae (which is left undecorated) represents a solar boat, which she compares to the gold boat depicted on the Nebra sky disc and to depictions of solar boats from the Nordic Bronze Age, as well as to depictions on pottery from Los Millares in Spain. According to Cahill, pairs of gold discs found with lunulae may therefore represent "the day and night sun", symbolising the movement of the sun from day to night and from east to west. The double-sun motif has also been linked to the mythological Divine Twins, as have ritual depositions of twinned objects, including two swords buried with the Nebra sky disc.

Scientific analyses have shown that gold used to make both the Irish lunulae and the Nebra sky disc originated from Cornwall, providing a further link between these artefacts. Cornwall was also the likely source of gold used to make artefacts from the Bush Barrow at Stonehenge. Gold used to make discs from western Asturias (northern Spain) dating from the Bell Beaker period, was similarly found to be of non-local origin and possibly from southern Britain.

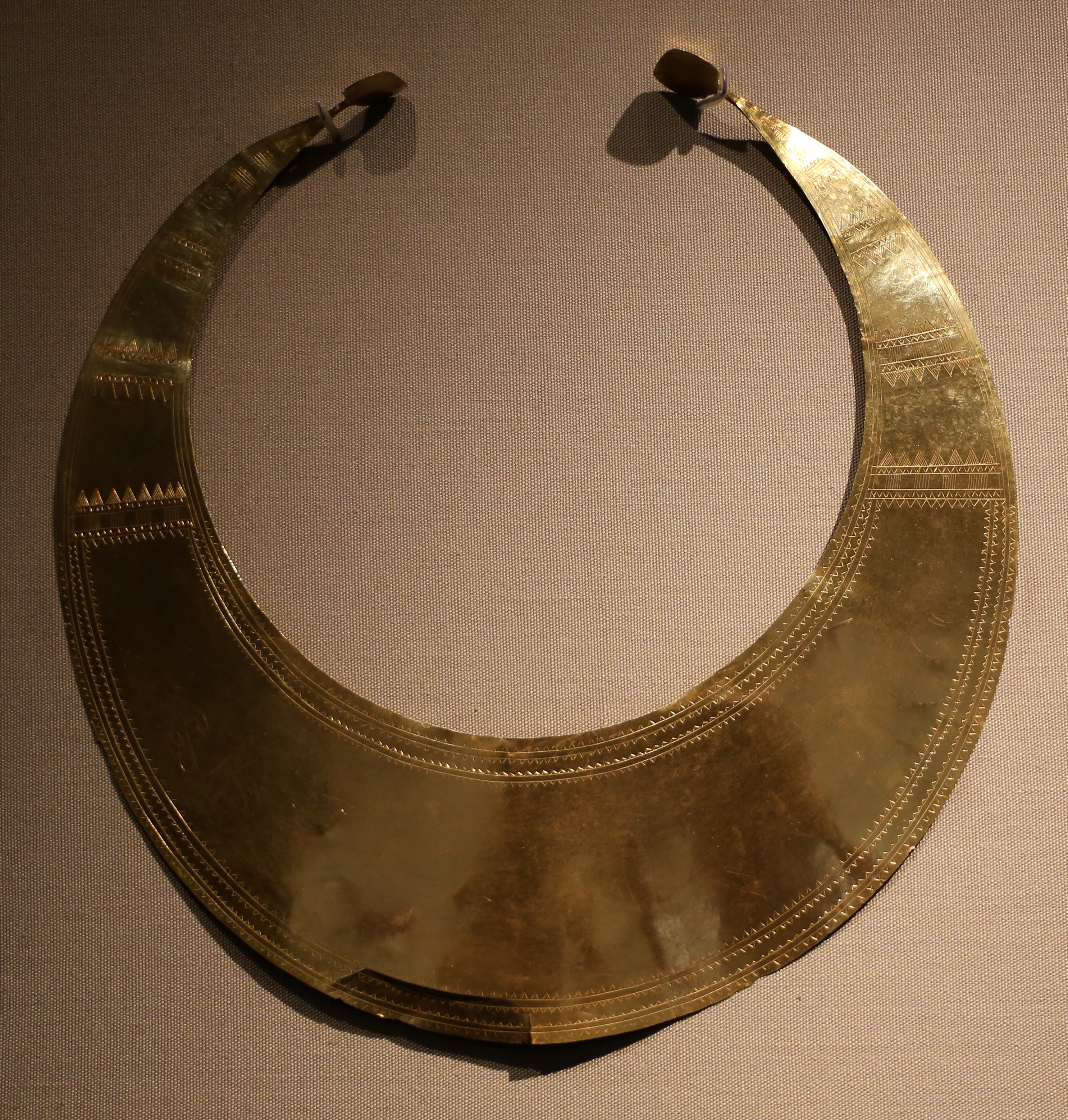
Gold lunula from Westmeath, c. 2000 BCE

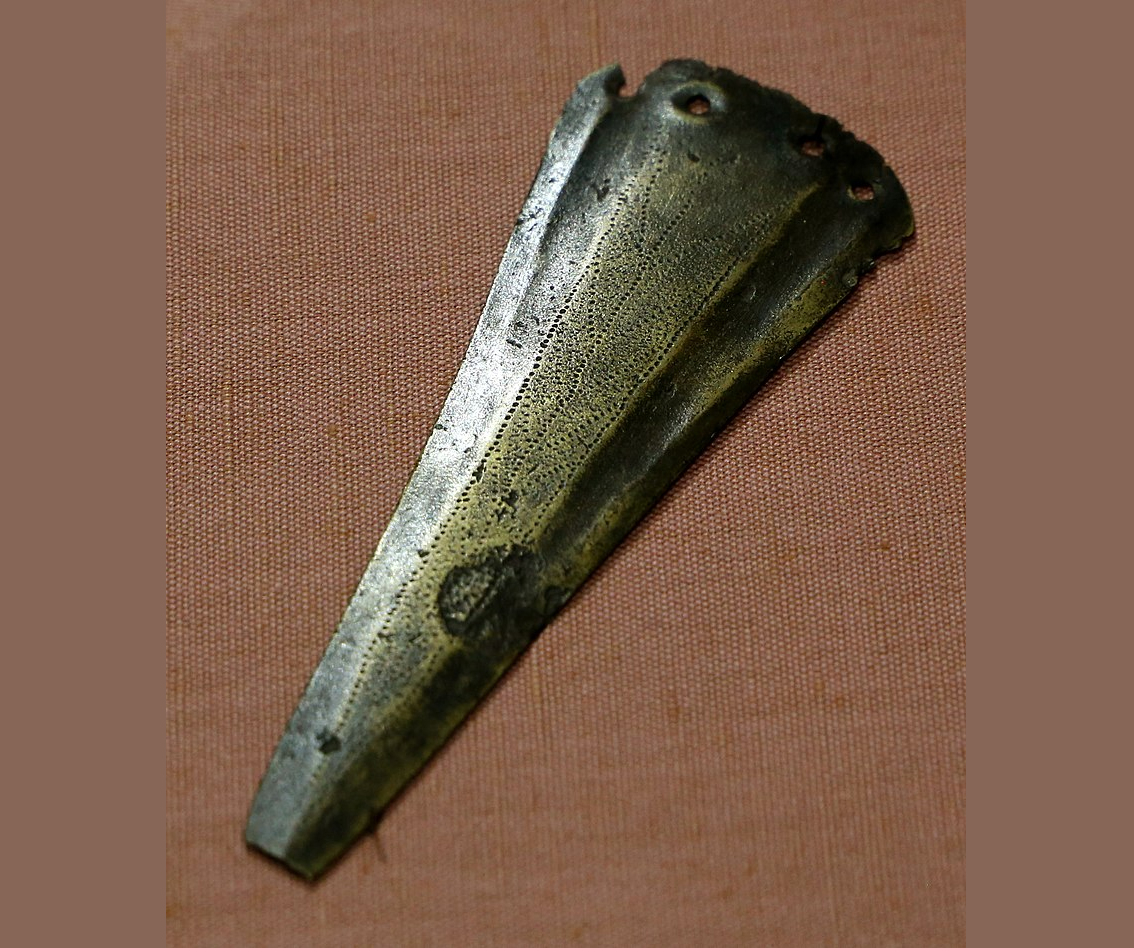
Bronze dagger, c. 1900 BCE

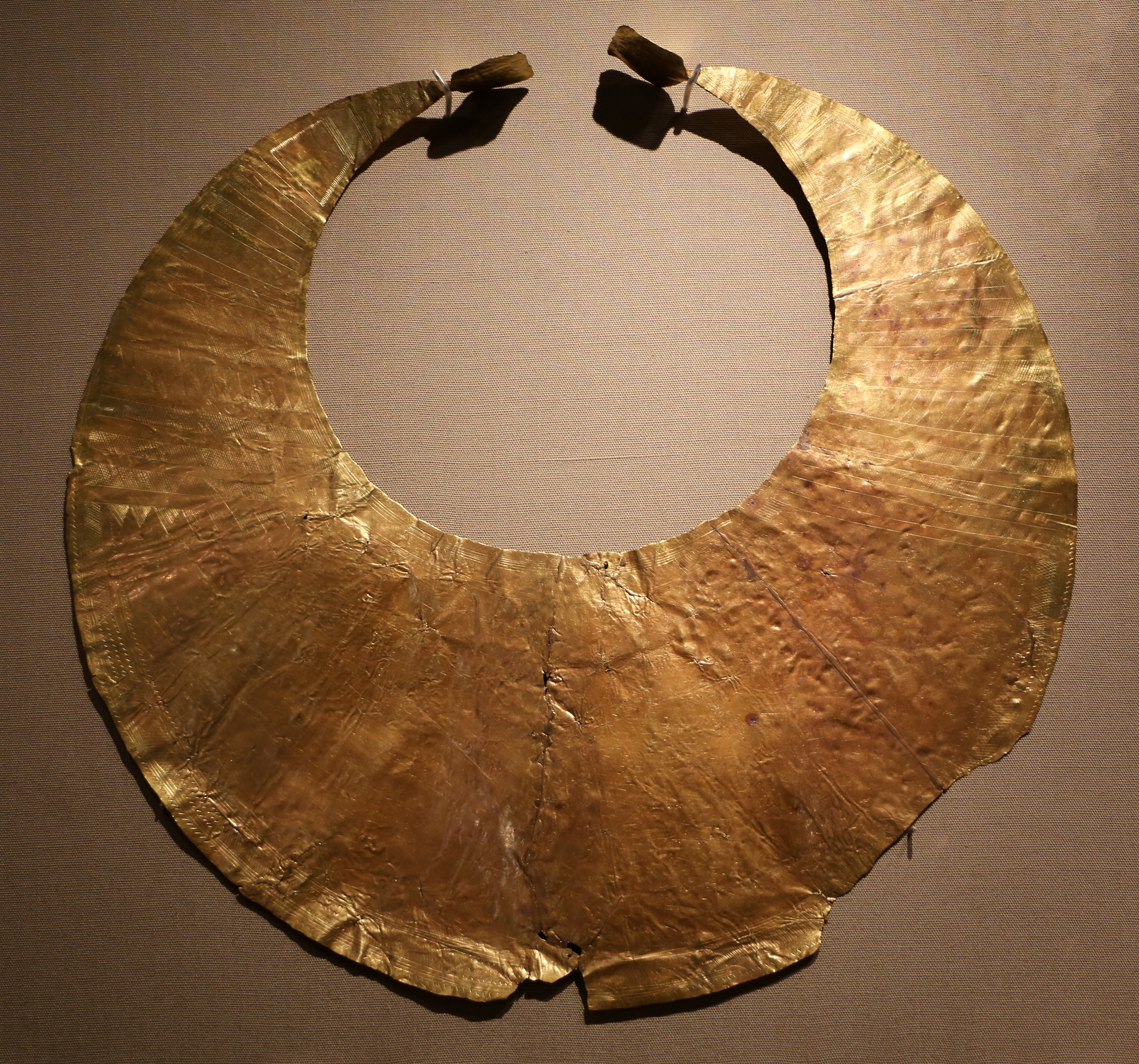
Gold lunula, c. 2000 BCE

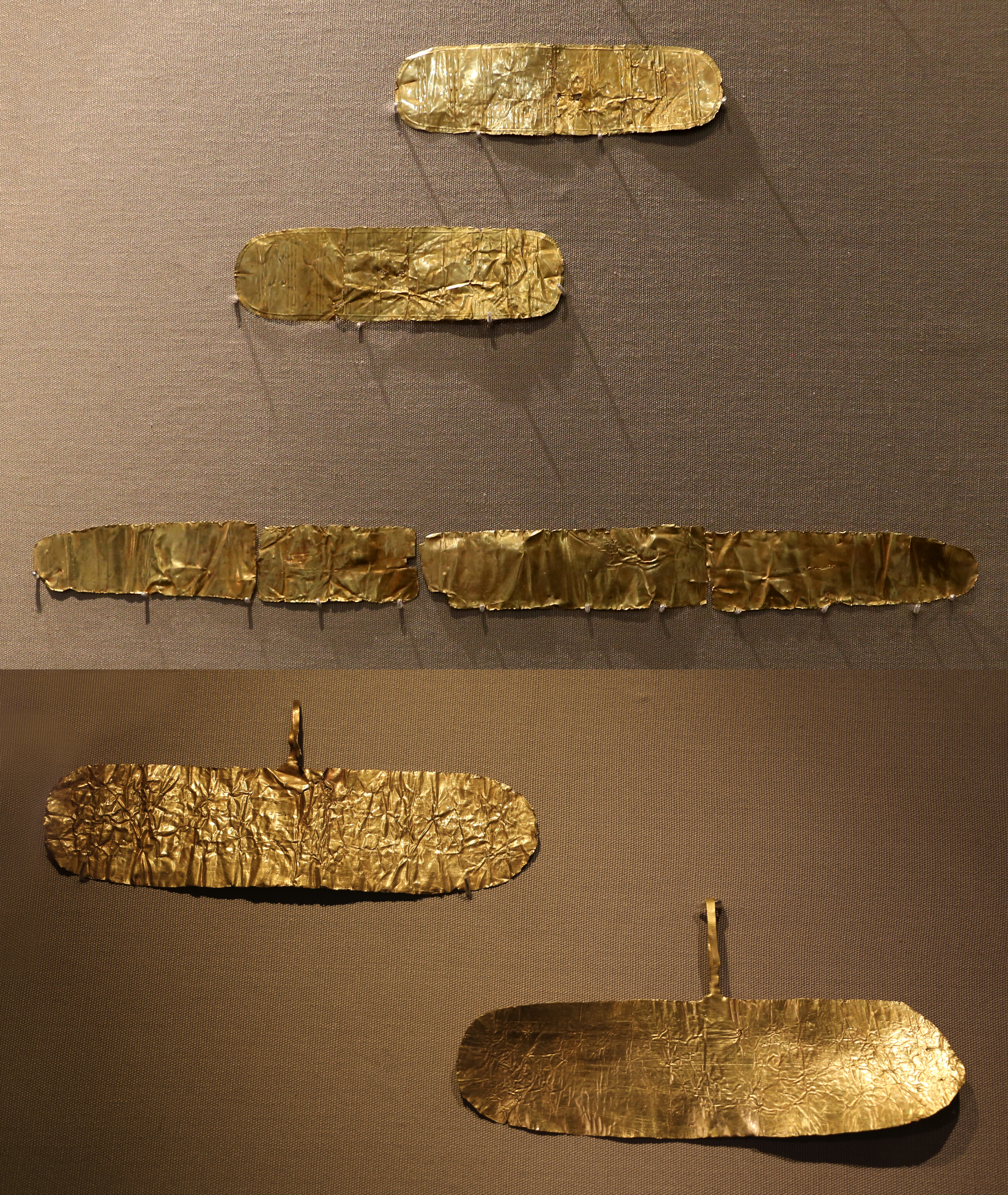
Gold ornaments, c. 2200 BCE

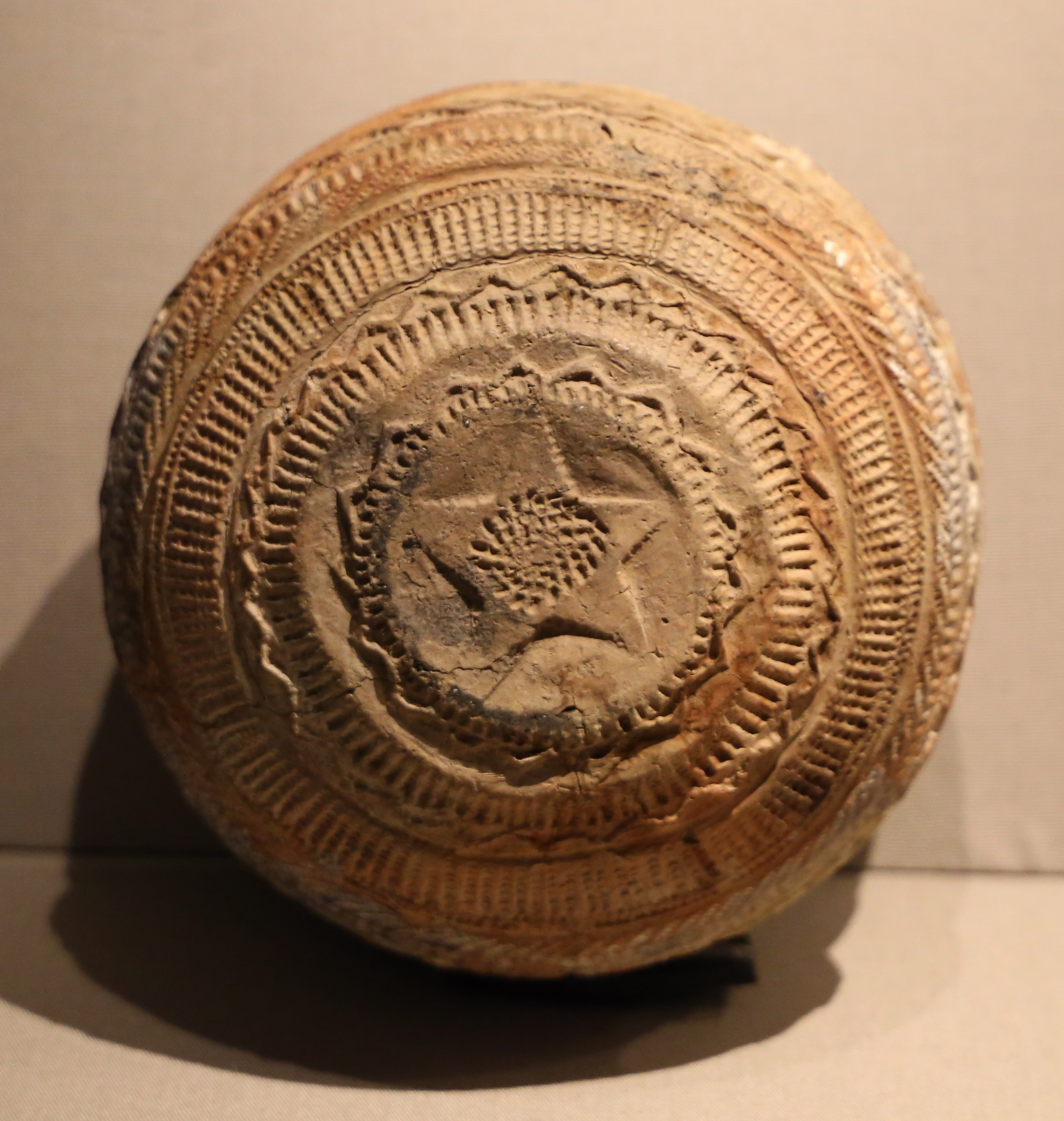
Bell Beaker ceramic, c. 2200 BCE

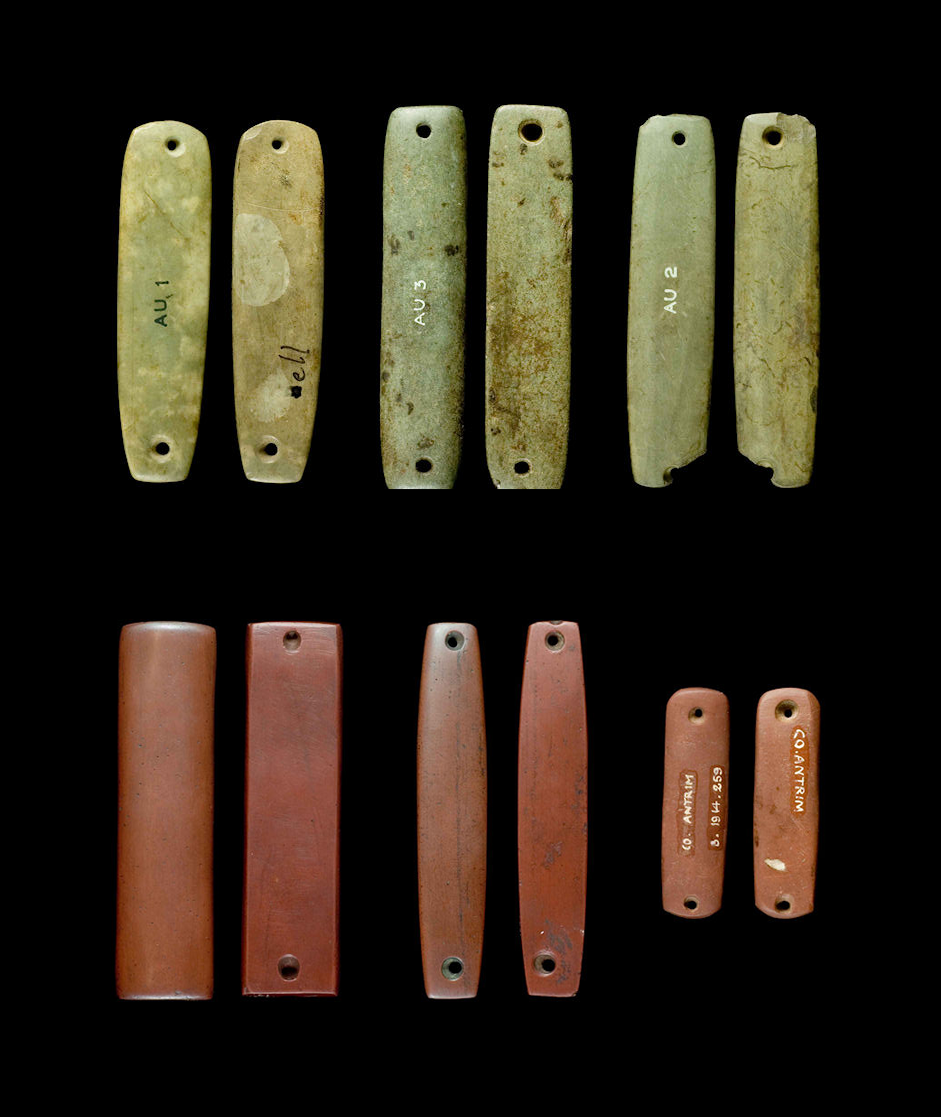
Stone wristguards

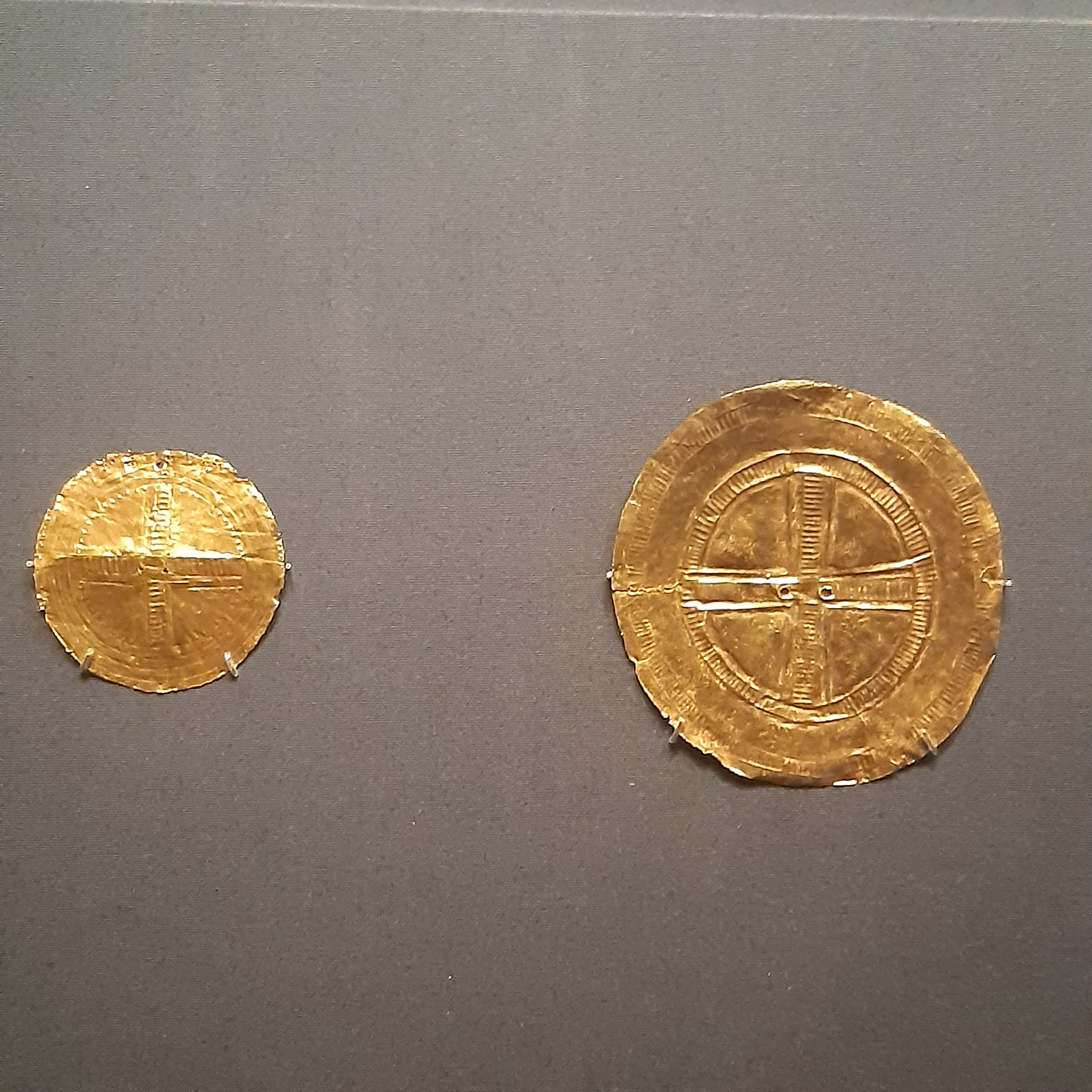
Gold discs, 2500-2000 BCE

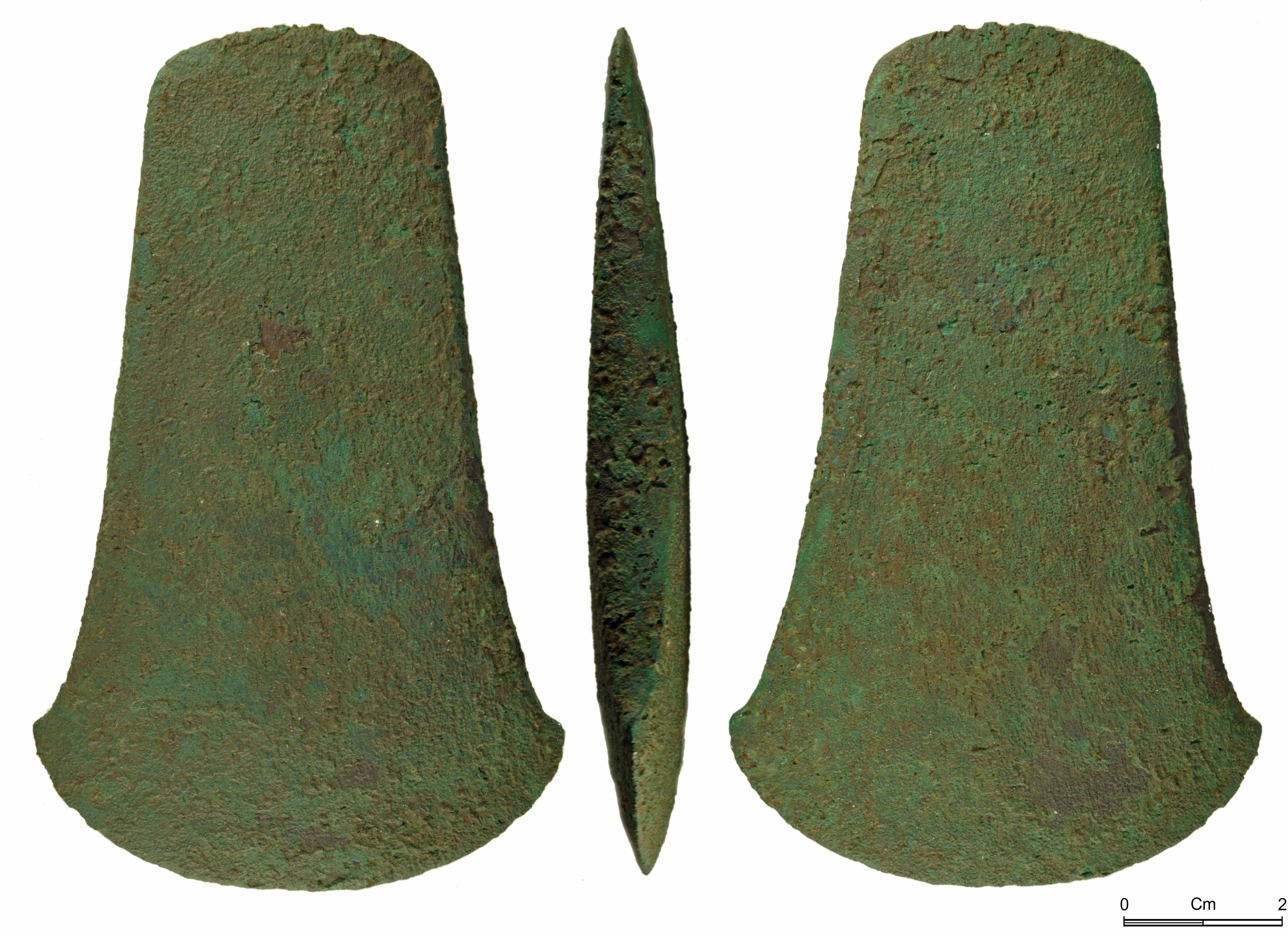
Copper axe, c.2300-2000 BCE

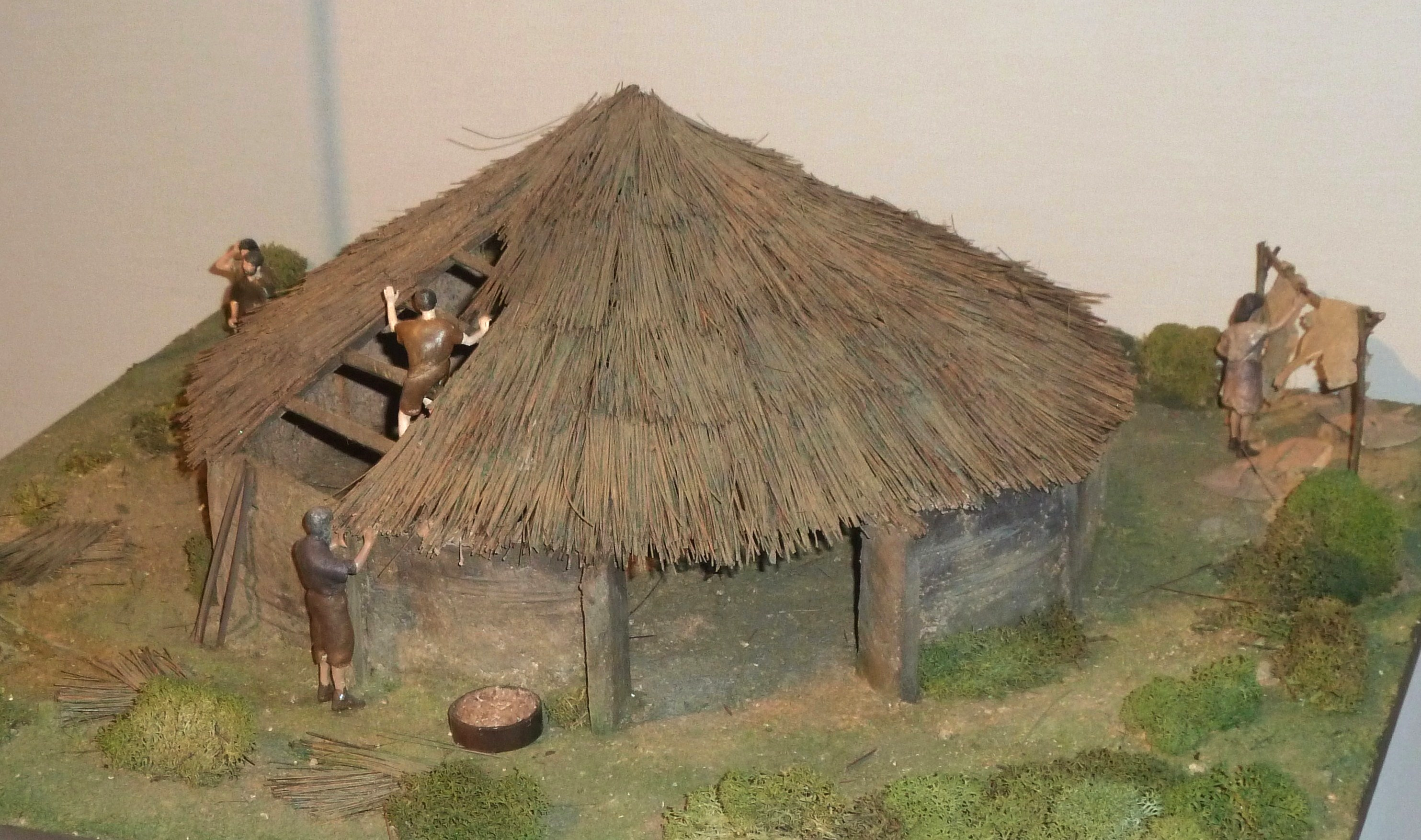
Model of an early Bronze Age house, County Down

=== Britain ===
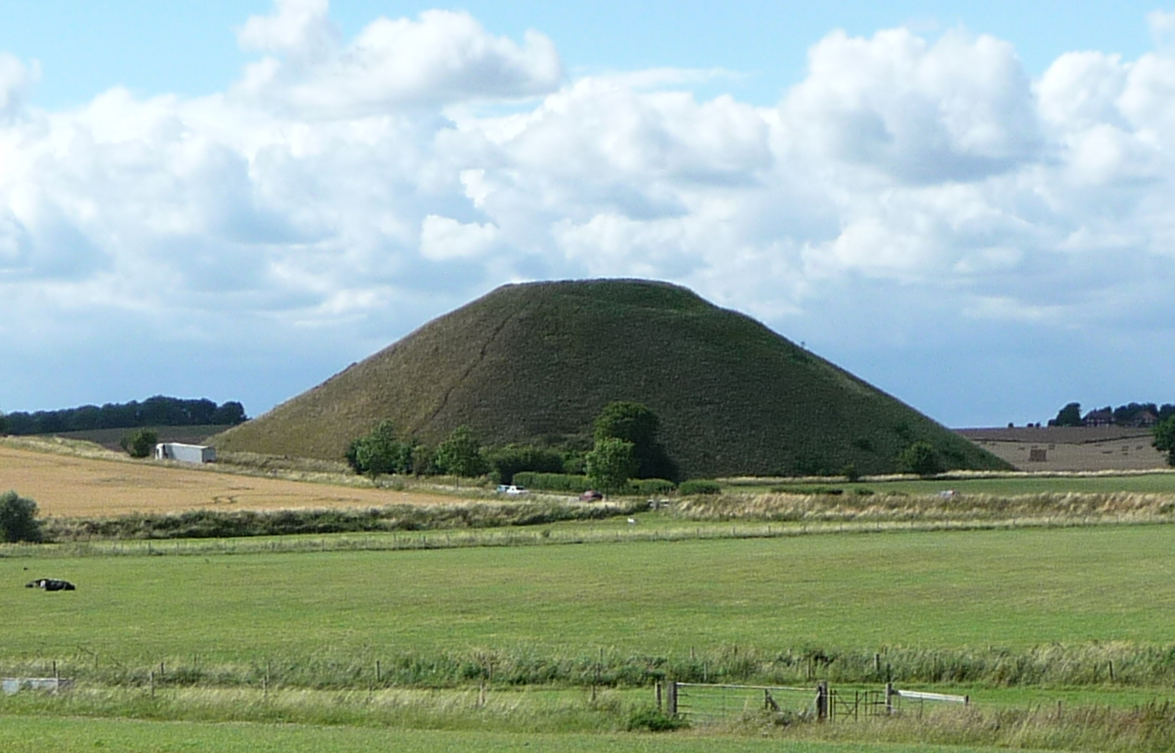
Silbury Hill, England, c. 2400 BCE

Beakers arrived in Britain in c.2500 BCE, with migrations of Corded Ware-related people, eventually resulting in a near total turnover of the British population. The Beaker-culture declined in use c.2200–2100 BCE with the emergence of food vessels and cinerary urns and finally fell out of use around 1700 BCE. The earliest British beakers were similar to those from the Rhine, but later styles are most similar to those from Ireland. In Britain, domestic assemblages from this period are very rare, making it hard to draw conclusions about many aspects of society. Most British beakers come from funerary contexts.

Britain's only unique export in this period is thought to be tin. It was probably gathered in streams in Cornwall and Devon as cassiterite pebbles and traded in this raw, unrefined state. South West England has the earliest evidence for tin ore exploitation in Europe. Other possible European sources of tin are located in Brittany and Iberia, but it is not thought they were exploited so early as these areas did not have bronze until after it was well established in Britain and Ireland. Tin was used to turn copper into bronze from c. 2200 BC and widely traded throughout Britain and into Ireland and continental Europe. Britain was the first region in Europe to fully adopt tin-bronze technology and switch all metalwork from copper and arsenical bronze to full tin-bronze, in the period 2200-2100 BCE. This full adoption subsequently occurred across Scandinavia and Central Europe by around 1800 BCE and later in southern Iberia, the Aegean (Greece) and Egypt by around 1500/1300 BCE. Gold was also exported from Cornwall to Ireland and continental Europe.

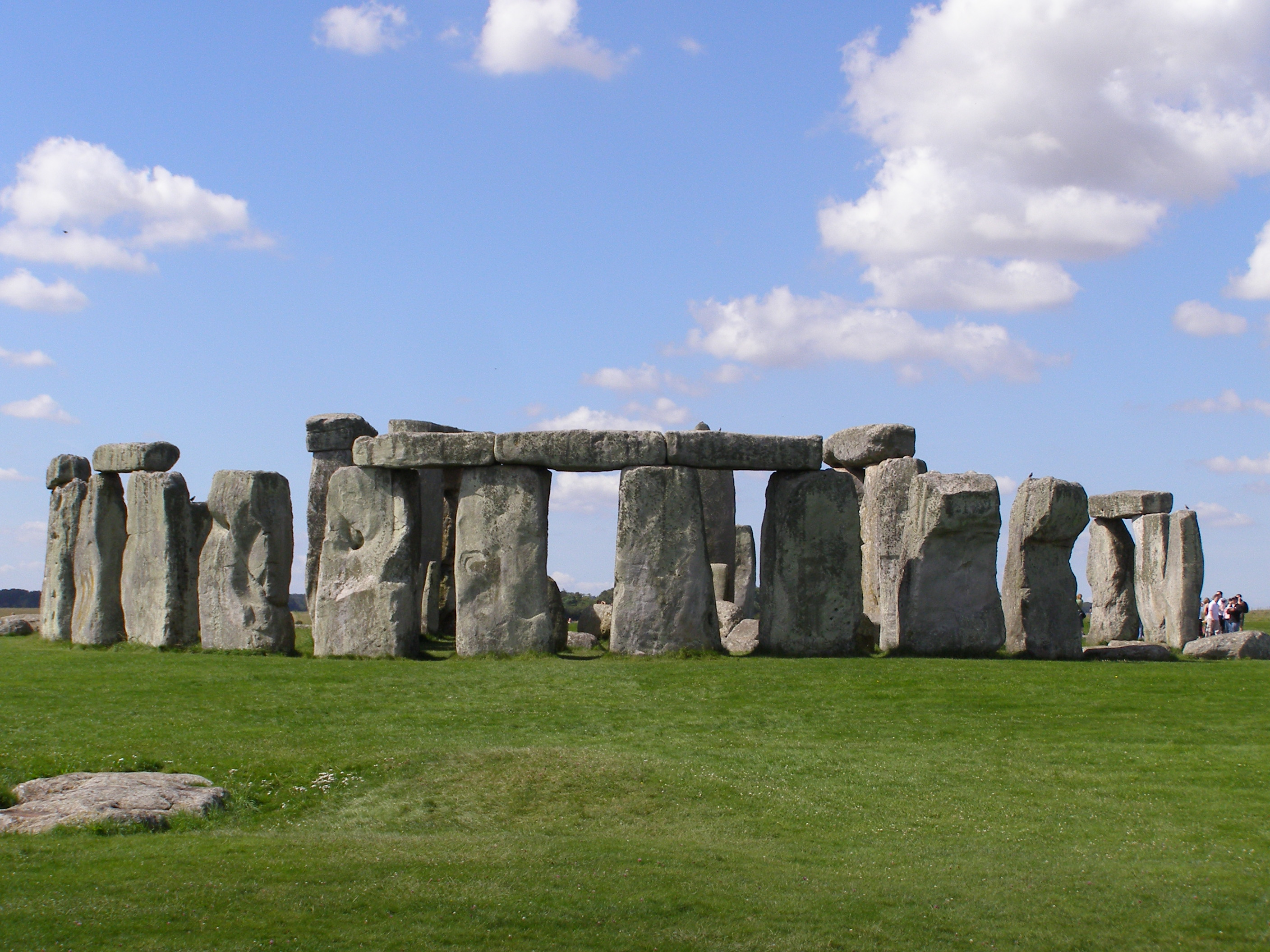
Stonehenge, England, c. 2500 BCE

The most famous site in Britain from this period is Stonehenge, which had its Neolithic form elaborated extensively. Many barrows surround it and an unusual number of 'rich' burials can be found nearby, such as the Amesbury Archer and the later Bush Barrow.

Close similarities have been noted between Stonehenge and the Pömmelte circular enclosure in central Germany, which was built by Bell Beaker people around 2300 BCE. Large timber circles in Britain such as Woodhenge, near to Stonehenge, are similarly dated to the early Beaker period or just before the Beaker period. Some researchers have suggested that Woodhenge may have been a monumental roofed building, though it is usually thought to have been an open-air structure. Silbury Hill was also built in the early Bell Beaker period, and may have originally been a burial mound, though this has never been proven.

According to Bayliss (2007), the "aggrandisement" of both Stonehenge and Silbury Hill occurred "in close relation to the appearance of novel material culture and practices" introduced by Beaker people. The archaeologist Mike Parker Pearson has noted that a significantly higher level of labour mobilisation was achieved following the arrival of Beaker people in Britain The amount of effort that went into building Silbury Hill was "massively more than Stonehenge", and its dates coincide exactly with the appearance of Beaker burials. Beaker people also introduced mummification, burial in log coffins and cranial deformation to Britain.

The archaeologist Timothy Darvill has argued that Stonehenge functioned as a solar calendar, reflecting the spread of solar cosmologies across Northern Europe in the third millennium BCE. Darvill has also suggested that the Stonehenge trilithons may have represented twin gods or an early form of the Divine Twins. Other researchers have emphasized the lunar aspects of Stonehenge, such as the apparent alignment of the Station Stone rectangle with the Major Lunar Standstill, which occurs every 18.6 years. Various other astronomical interpretations have been proposed, such as the theory put forward by astronomers Gerald Hawkins and Fred Hoyle that the ring of 56 Aubrey Holes could have been used to predict lunar eclipses. The 19 stones of the Inner (bluestone) Horseshoe may also represent knowledge of the 19-year lunisolar Metonic cycle. According to the archaeologist Euan MacKie, Stonehenge recorded both the solar and lunar cycles "in an ingenious design based on Pythagorean triangles", reflecting the geometric relations of astronomical events (such as the solstices and lunar standstills) at the specific latitude of Stonehenge (51° North). A similar understanding of geometry and astronomy is thought to be demonstrated by the design of early Bronze Age artefacts such as the gold 'lozenge' from Bush Barrow, dating from c. 1950 BCE.

Other artefacts of particular interest in this period are the Ferriby boats, found on the Humber Estuary, which are Europe's oldest sewn-plank boats, dating from as early as 2030 BCE. These are the oldest known sewn-plank boats in the world outside of Egypt. A later example is the Dover Boat from southern England, dating from 1550 BCE.

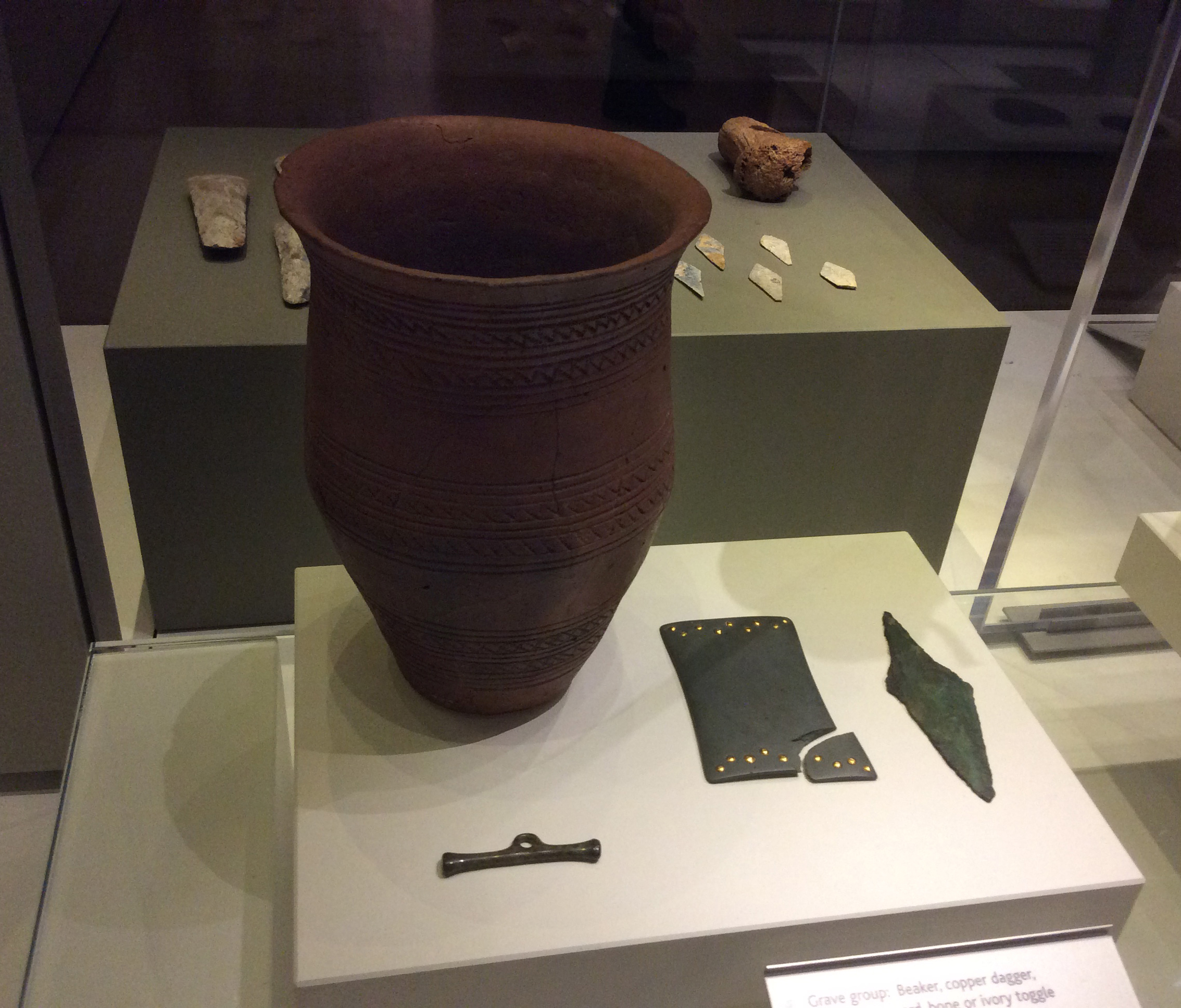
Beaker, wrist-guard with gold studs, copper dagger and toggle.

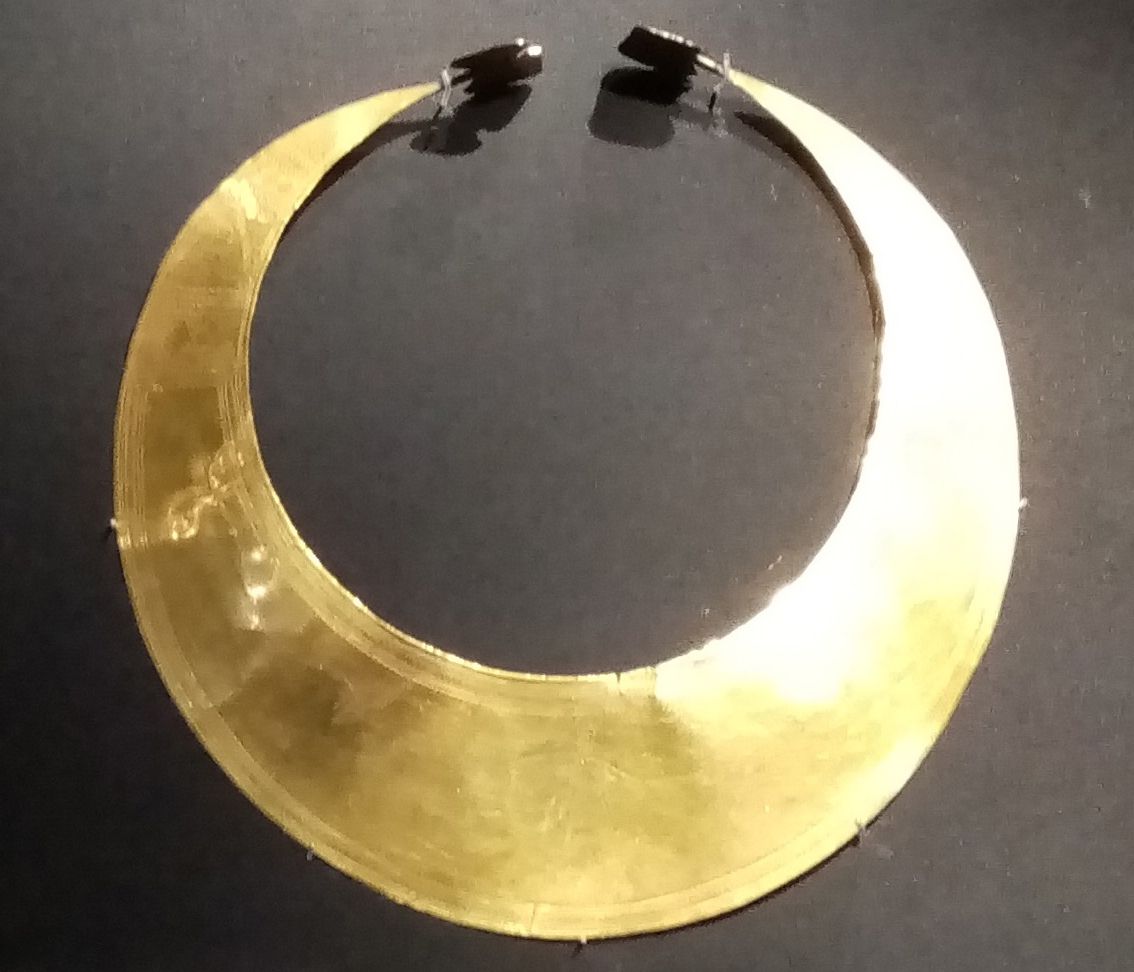
Gold lunula from Cornwall, c. 2400 BCE.

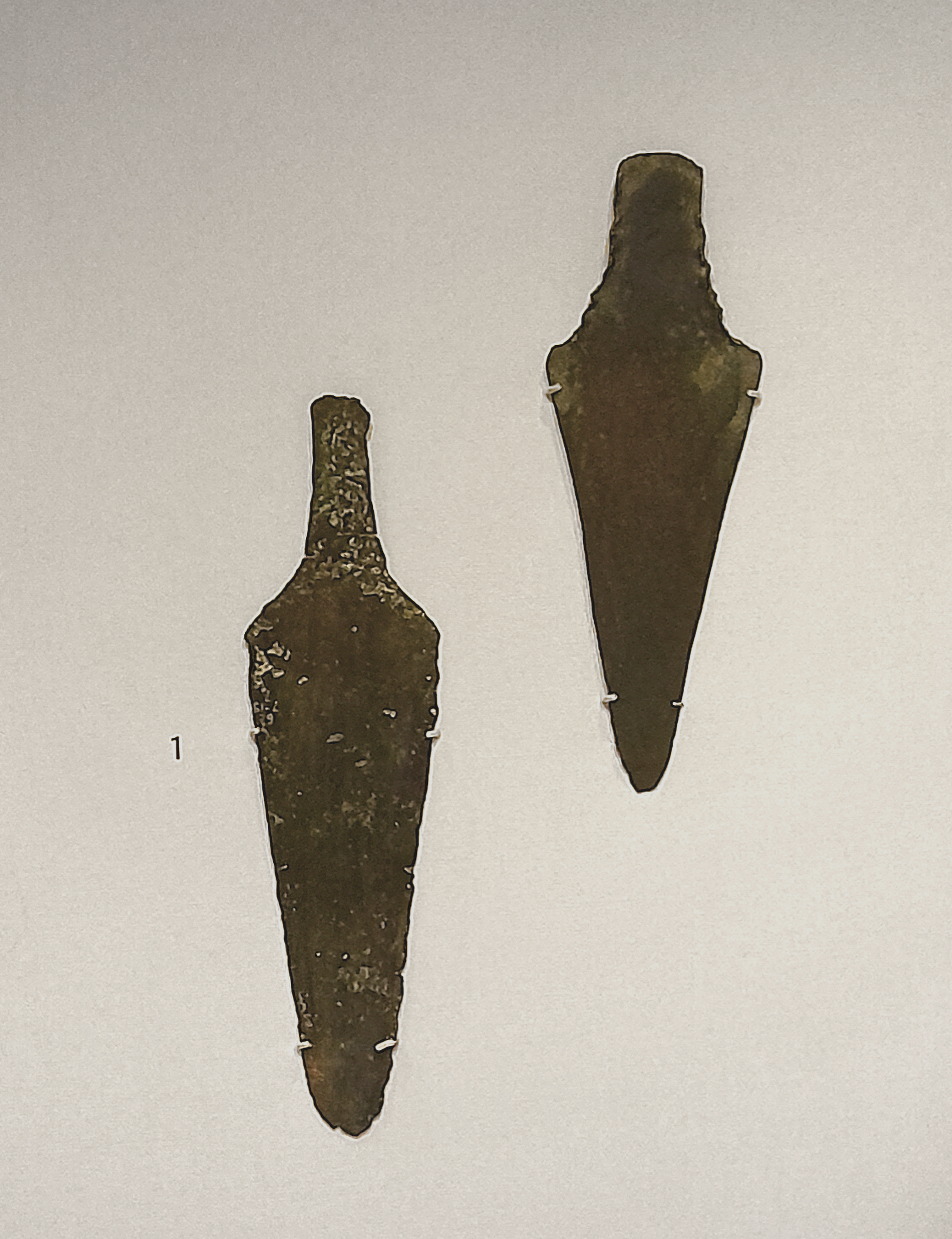
Metal daggers

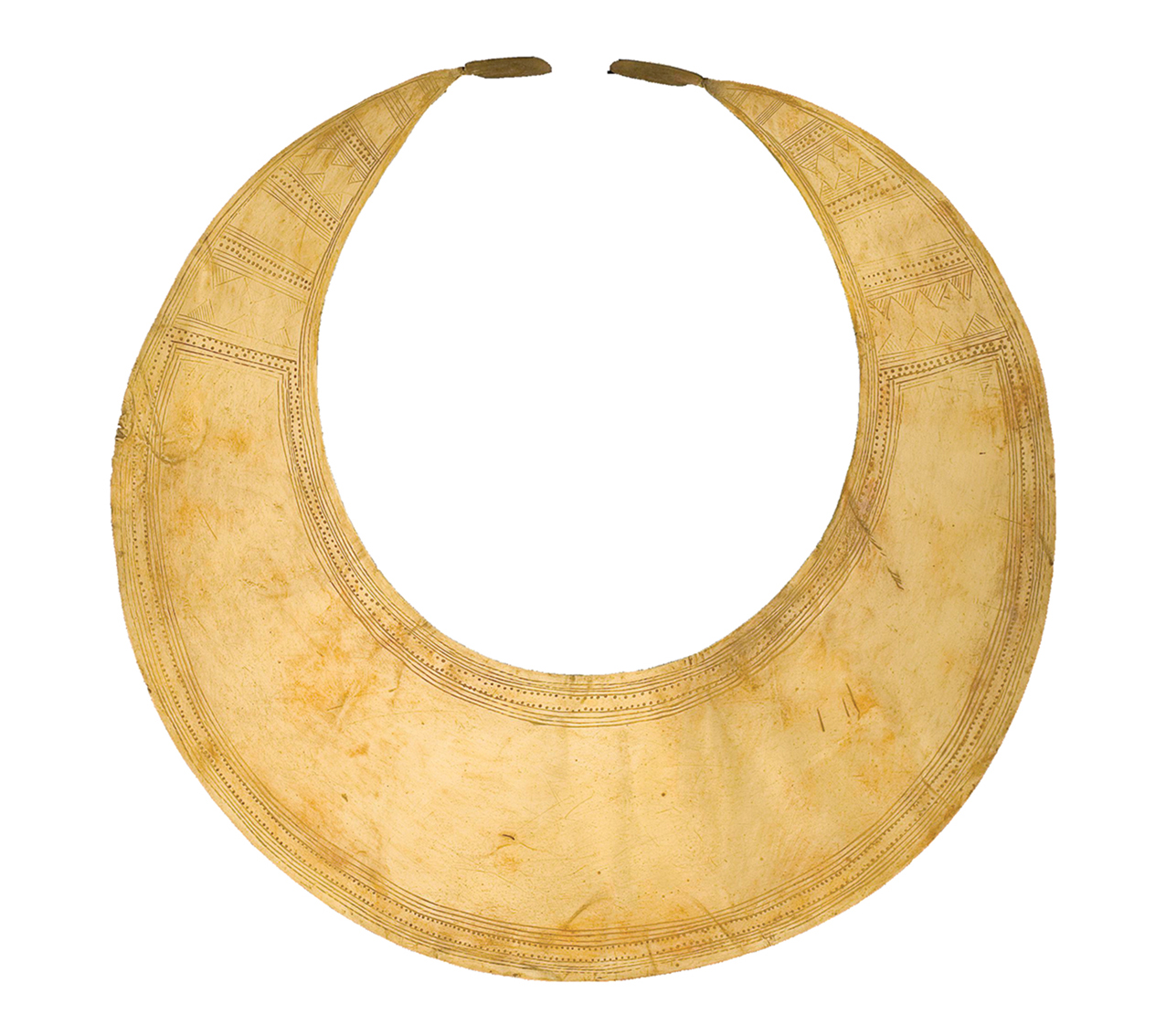
Gold lunula, Wales, 2400-2000 BCE.

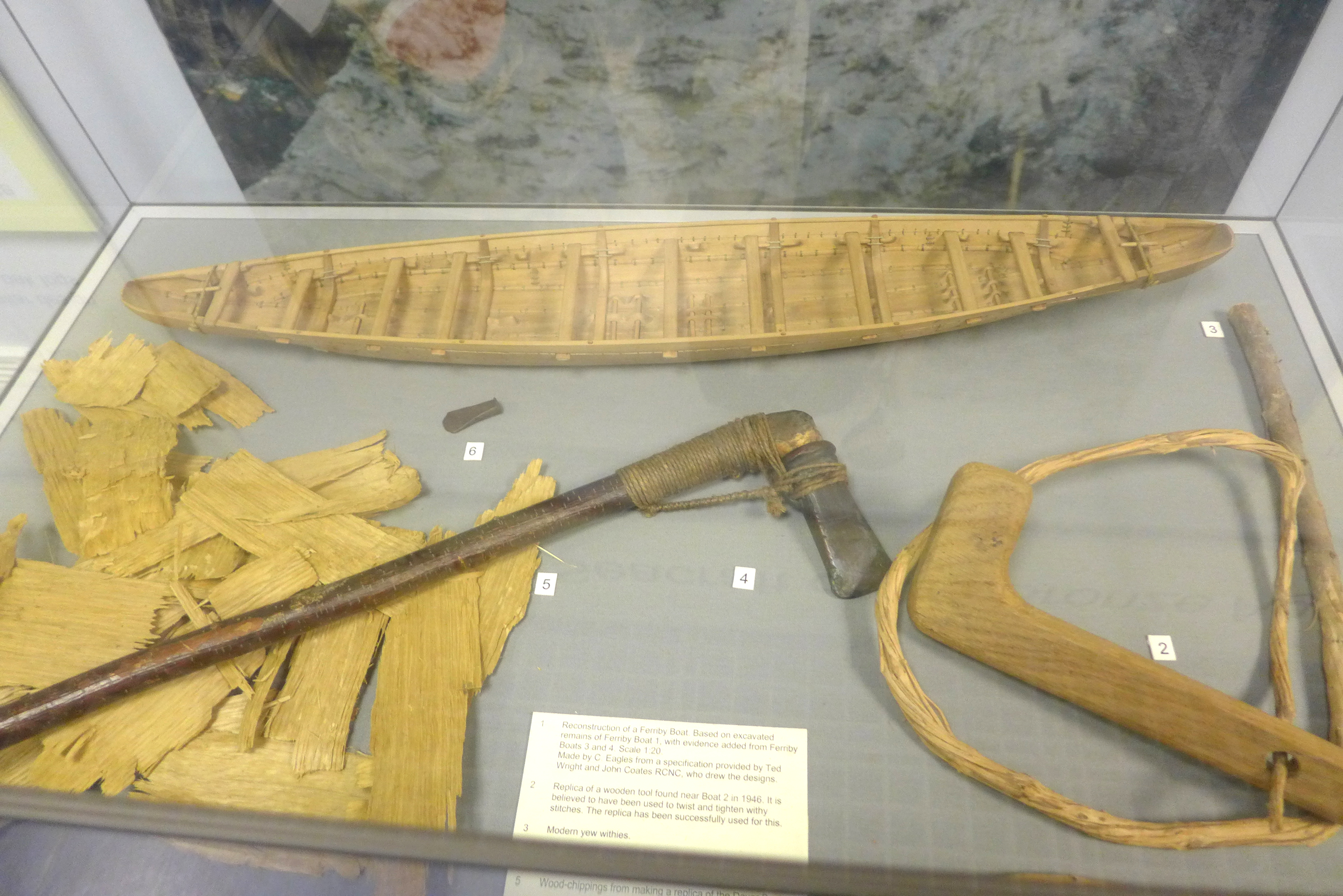
Ferriby boat, c. 2000 BCE, model and replica tools

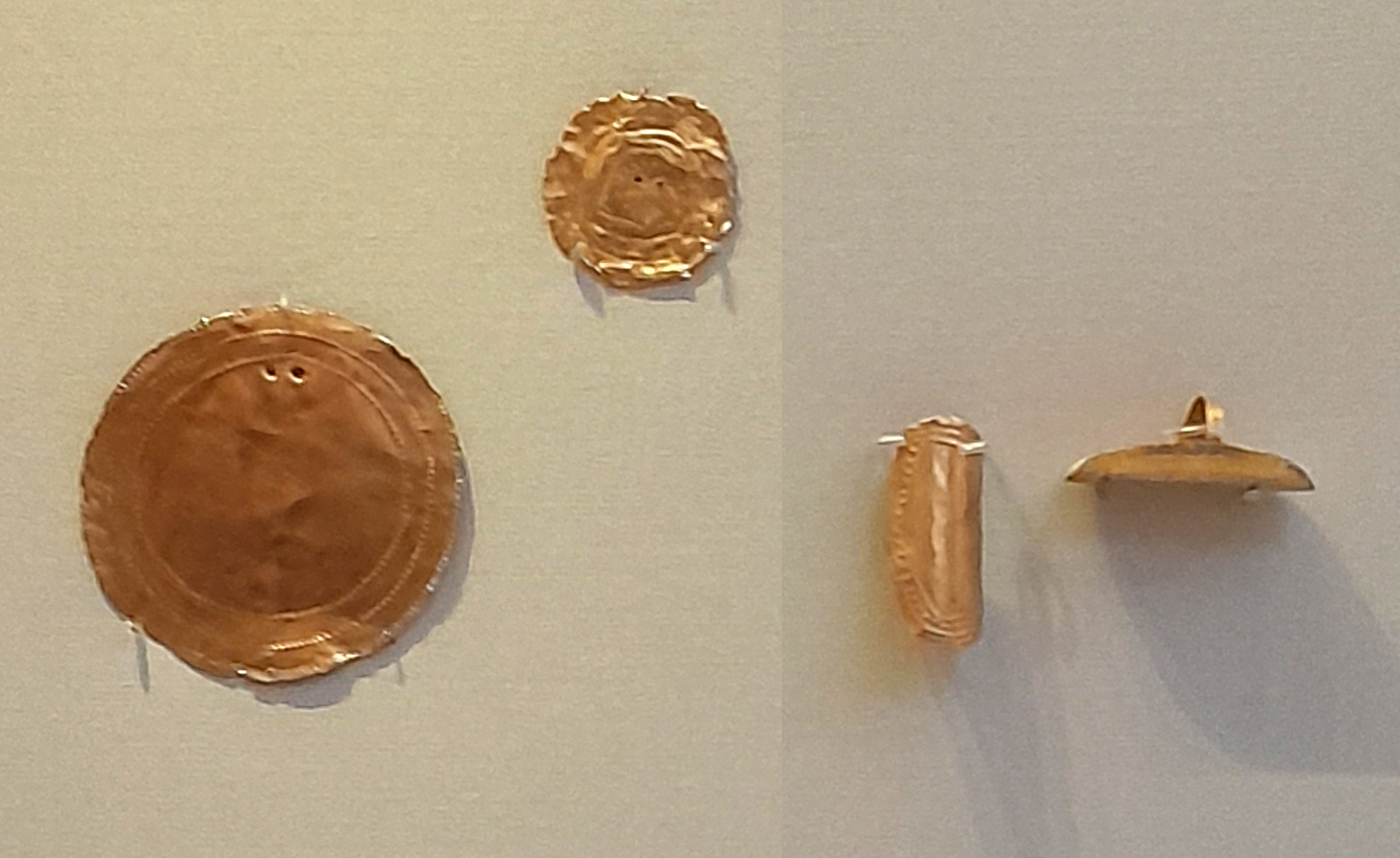
Gold discs and ornaments

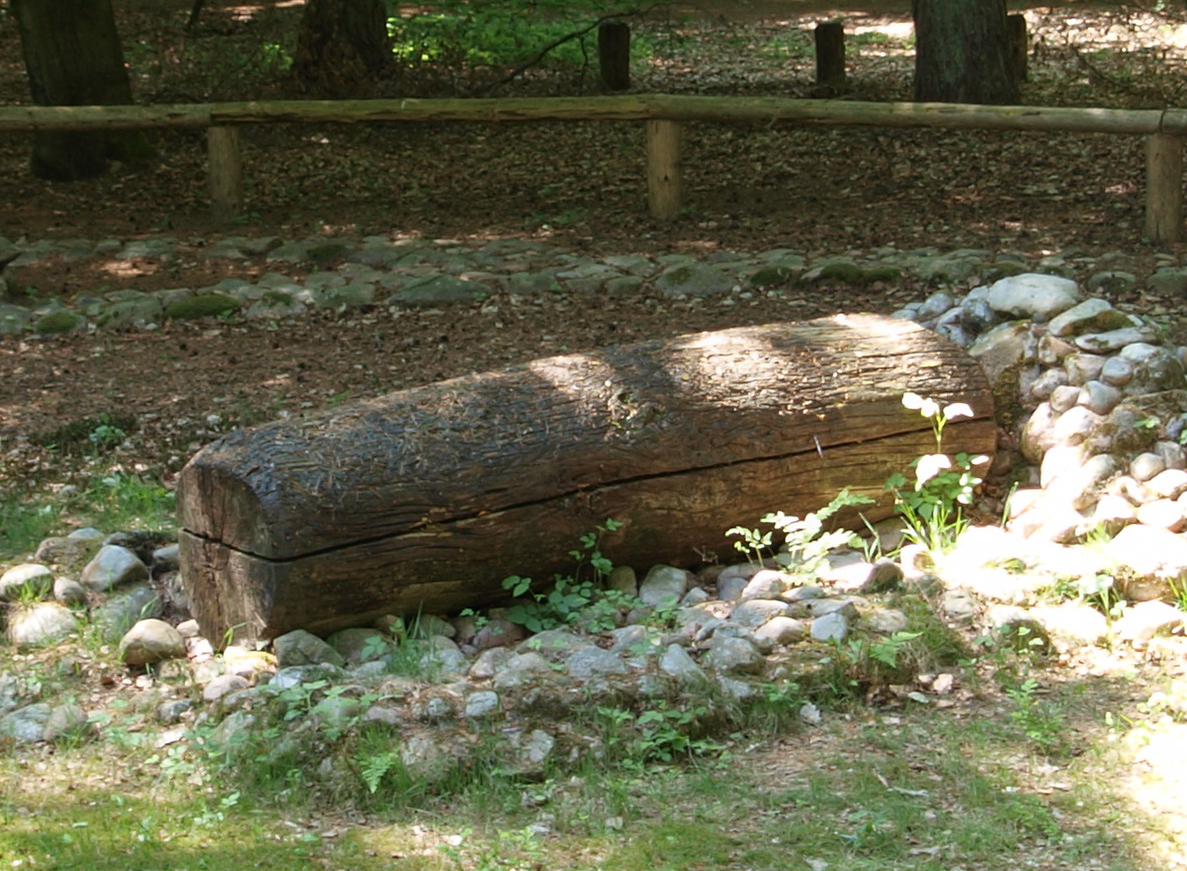
Log coffin burial, reconstruction.

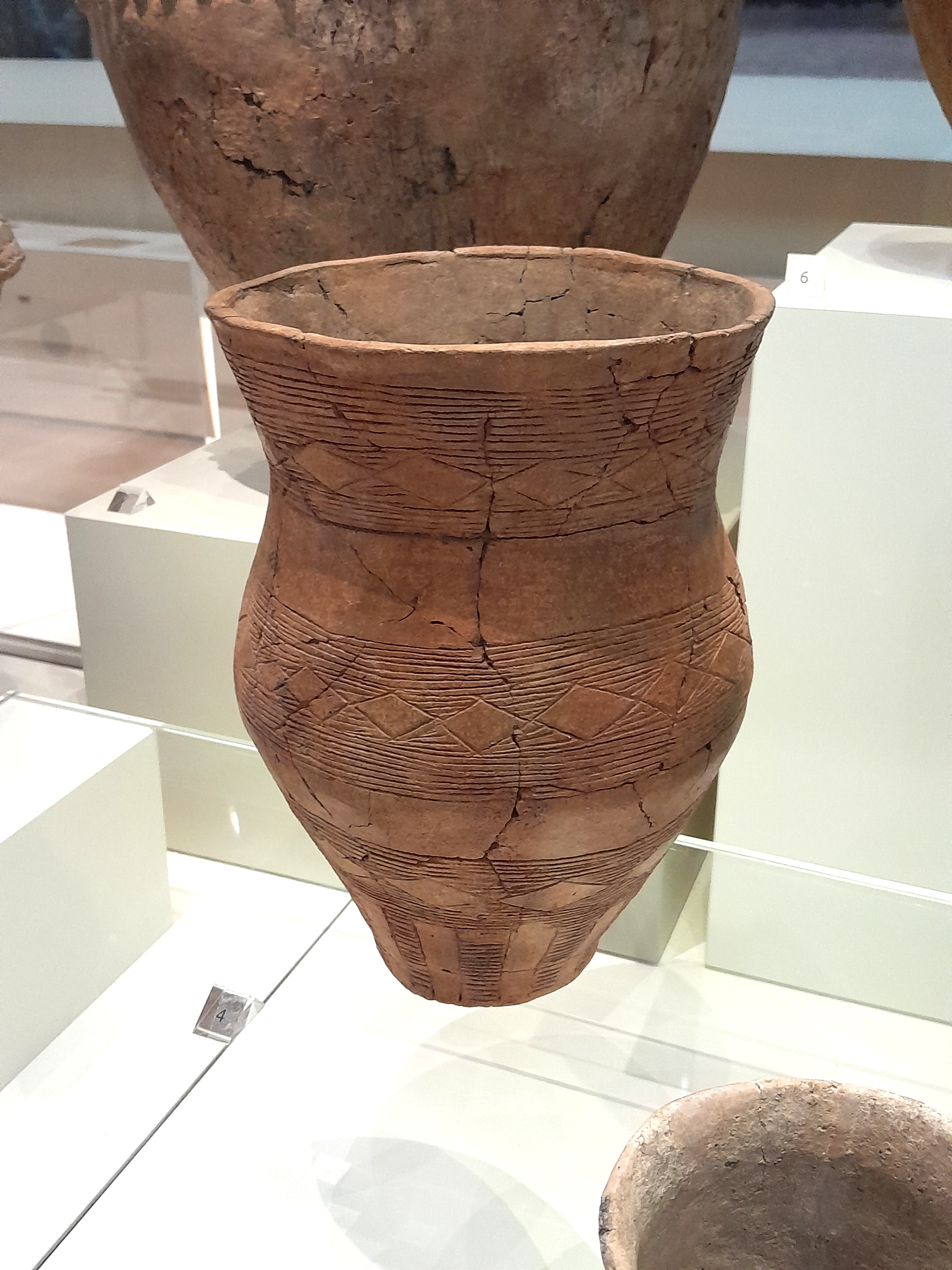
Beaker

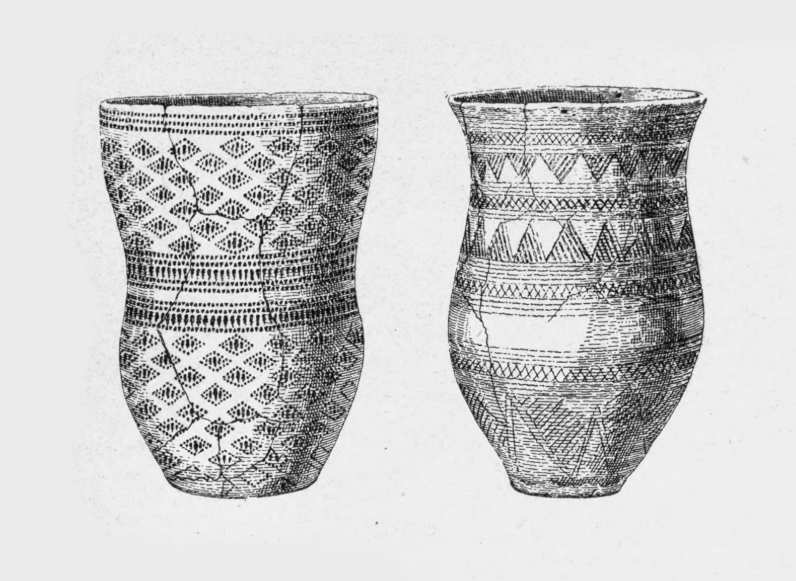
Decorated Bell Beakers, England

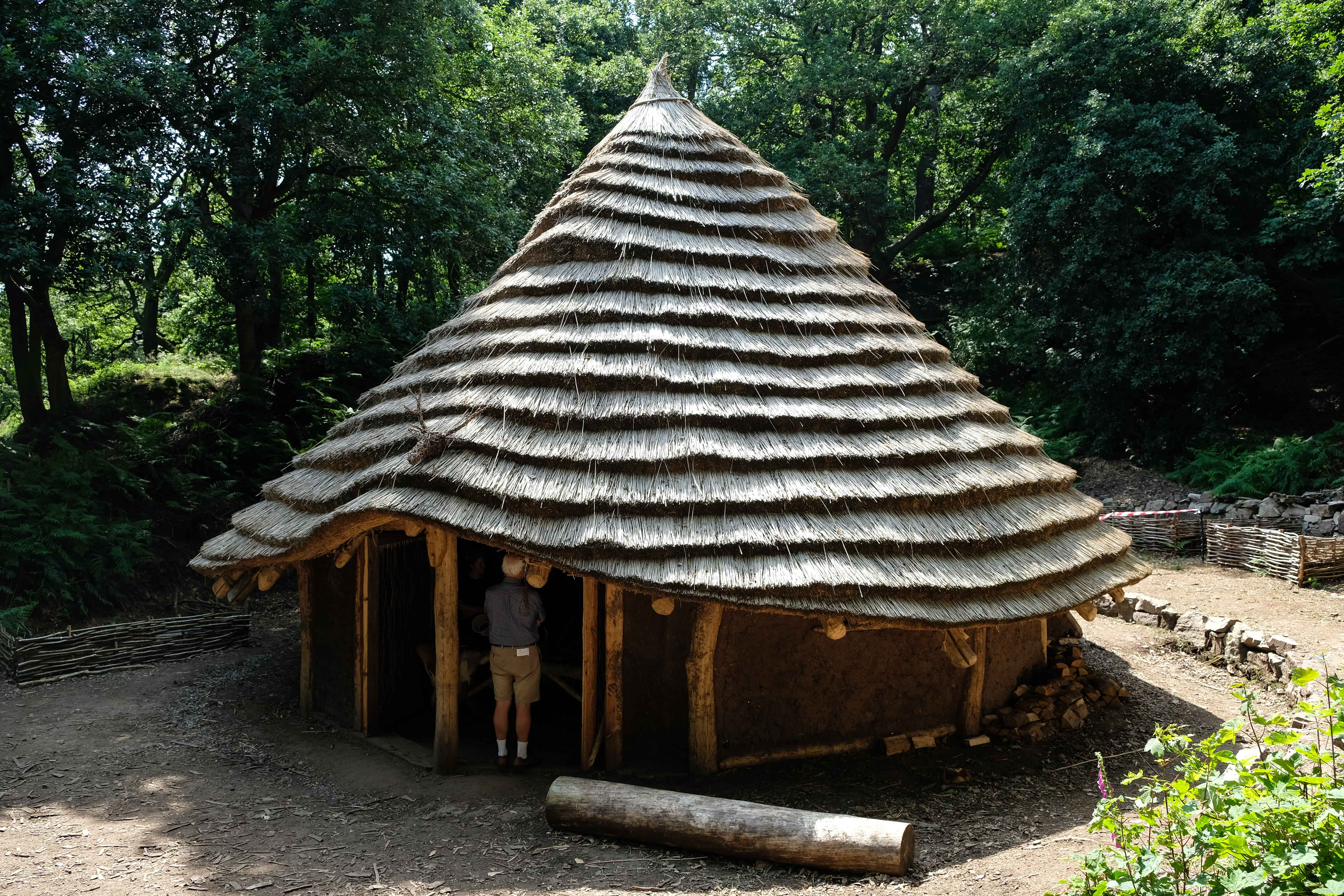
Reconstruction of a roundhouse dating from 2000 BCE

=== Italian Peninsula ===
Bell Beaker core/periphery/margin areas during the Early Bronze Age.

During the Late Copper Age (approximately 2500–2200 BCE), the Bell Beaker phenomenon reached the Italian Peninsula, where its cultural elements were selectively adopted as foreign influences and integrated into pre-existing traditions, particularly the Remedello and Rinaldone cultures, rather than resulting in a complete cultural replacement. This process was most pronounced in the Po Valley, especially around Lake Garda, and in Tuscany, although Bell Beaker materials have also been documented throughout northern and central Italy.

The Italian peninsula occupied a strategic position at the intersection of western Mediterranean and Central-Eastern European interaction networks, a position reflected in the marked regional differentiation of Bell Beaker material culture:

- Assemblages originating from the north-western areas, particularly Liguria and Piedmont, display closer affinities with southern France and the Rhône corridor, reflecting participation in western European exchange and communication networks.
- Assemblages from the central and eastern Po Plain, encompassing Lombardy, Veneto and Emilia, exhibit stronger connections with the Central European Bell Beaker tradition, particularly its Eastern Group in Bohemia and Bavaria, and the Csepel Group in the middle Danube region. These affiliations are especially apparent in the associated undecorated domestic pottery (Begleitkeramik), including handled pitchers and polypod bowls.
- Middle Tyrrhenian Bell Beaker group in Tuscany and Northern Lazio. In Central Latium, evidence of interaction with the Bell Beaker phenomenon is attested, although its distinctive characteristics are absent. By contrast, in the area between Latium and Southern Tuscany, Bell Beaker and Rinaldone cultural groups coexisted within the same geographical area.

In southern and southeastern Italy, Bell Beaker influences remained limited, initially manifesting as isolated adoptions of characteristic decorative motifs on local pottery that were incorporated into indigenous traditions, producing syncretic ceramic forms rather than developing into an independent Bell Beaker cultural province. Later manifestations of this interaction include the Italian Cetina phenomenon in Abruzzo, Apulia and Calabria, and the Laterza culture in Campania. In the Rome and Lazio area, the incorporation of Bell Beaker elements in the local Laterza-related cultural tradition contributed to the emergence of the Ortucchio cultural group, which subsequently spread across parts of central Italy.

==== Archaeological evidence ====
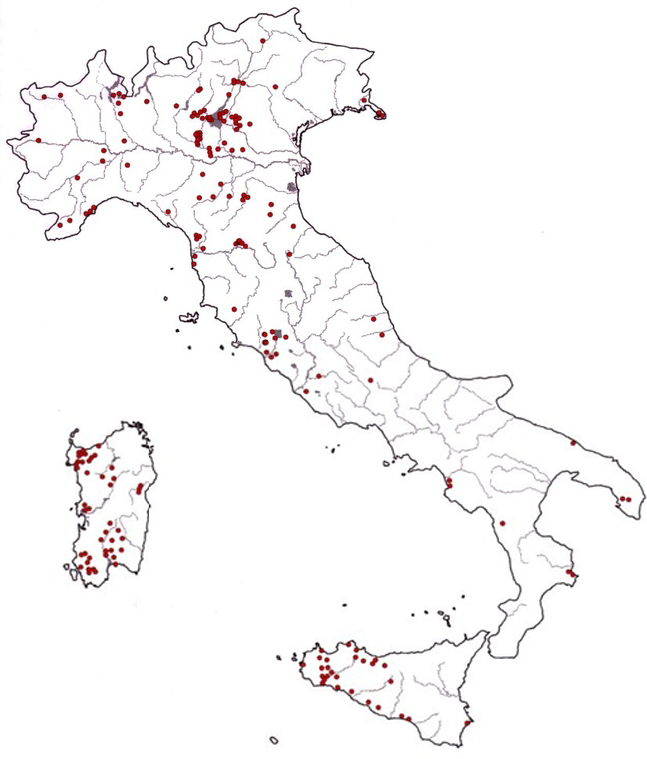
Bell Beaker sites in Italy

Unlike Central Europe, where individual inhumations and single-grave cemeteries are prominent features of the Bell Beaker phenomenon, evidence from the Po Plain is predominantly associated with settlements. These are distributed across a variety of environments, including river terraces, foothills and elevated sandy areas near watercourses, as well as caves and multi-phase rock shelters. Funerary evidence is comparatively scarce and reflects a diverse range of practices, including individual inhumations at sites such as Santa Cristina di Fiesse and Cà di Marco. Graves often contain multiple individuals, and their quadrangular architecture resembles those of central European “houses of the dead”, a feature that is quite common within the context of the Bell Beaker culture in Bohemia, Moravia, and Austria. Distinctive Bell Beaker items such as wrist-guards (archer's bracers), V-perforated buttons, and copper daggers appear in graves but are frequently found alongside indigenous artifact types.

Significant Bell Beaker graves and artifacts have been discovered across northern and central Italy:

- In the Brescia area, the grave of Ca' di Marco (Fiesse) contained distinctive Bell Beaker pottery and copper daggers, demonstrating the characteristic "package" of Bell Beaker material culture.
- In the Adige Valley, the earliest Bell Beaker pottery documented is a handled pitcher of type 34/35. It was discovered at Pigloner Kopf, near Pfatten (Vadena), approximately 50 km north of Trento, and dates to around 2500 BCE. The form had previously appeared in pre-Bell Beaker contexts in Poland, Slovakia, Hungary and Moravia around 2700 BCE, before spreading westward through Central Europe, reaching northern Italy by approximately 2500 BCE and Switzerland and southern France by around 2300 BCE.
- In Viterbo, the tomb complex of Fosso Conicchio yielded bell-shaped vessels alongside local pottery types, exemplifying the integration of Bell Beaker elements with indigenous traditions.
- At Sesto Fiorentino near Florence, Bell Beaker materials have been found in settlement contexts, providing insight into domestic life beyond the more common funerary discoveries.
- The Lunigiana region between Tuscany and Liguria has yielded several Bell Beaker sites, including the noteworthy finds at Pianaccia di Suvero, which show connections to both Italian and French Bell Beaker traditions.

==== Cultural impact and legacy ====
The Bell Beaker phenomenon in Italy was regionally diverse and gradually disappeared during the transition from the Copper Age to the Bronze Age. It contributed to the development of subsequent cultural traditions, particularly through technological innovations, metallurgical practices and expanded interregional exchange networks. In northern Italy, the latest Bell Beaker manifestations partly overlapped with the emergence of the Polada culture, while in central Italy, Bell Beaker traditions were followed by a succession of regional Early Bronze Age developments that eventually formed the cultural background for the Proto-Apennine culture.

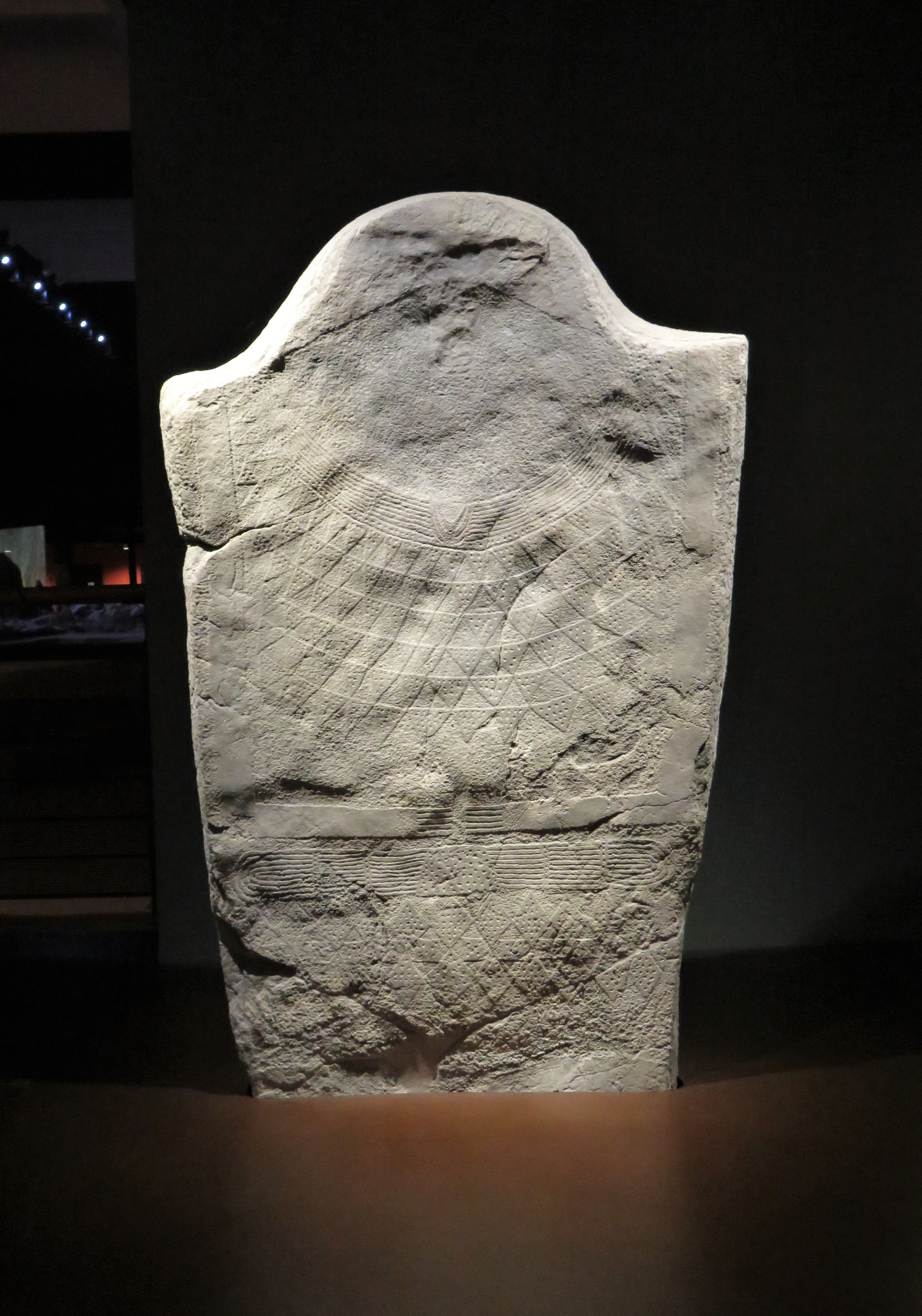
Anthropomorphic stele, Saint-Martin-de-Corléans

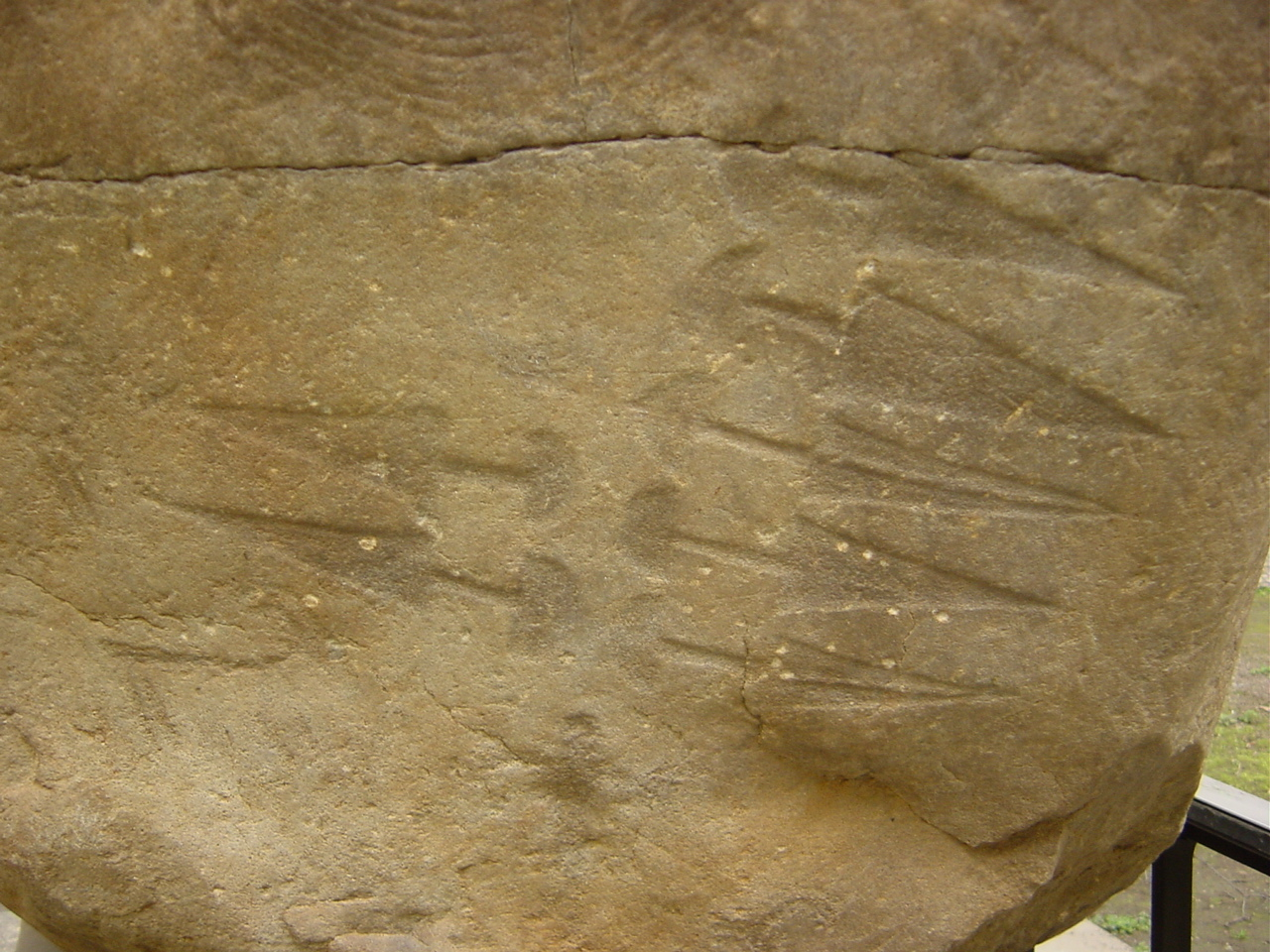
Dagger petroglyphs from Val Camonica in northern Italy

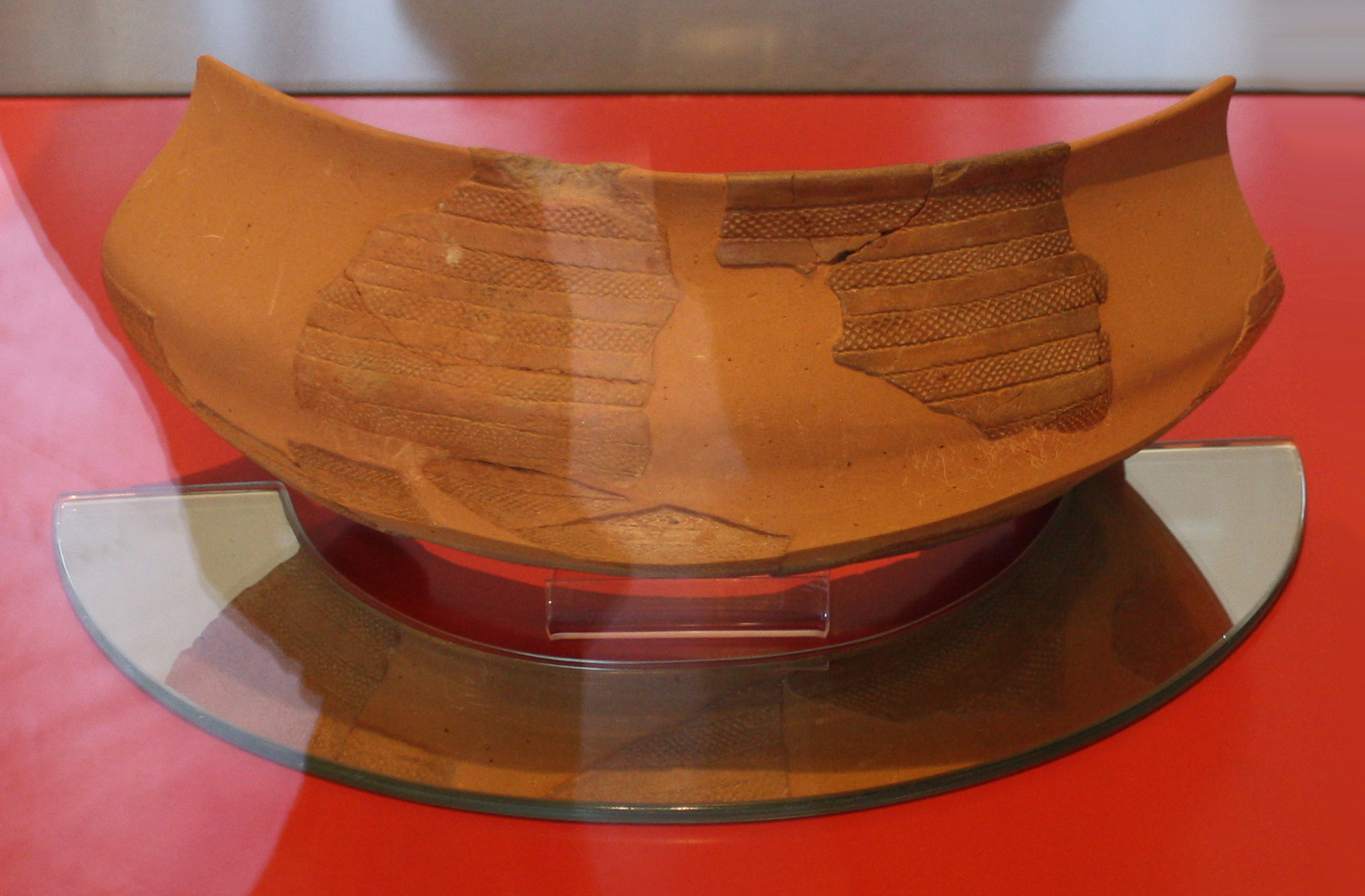
Bell Beaker pottery from Castellanza in northern Italy

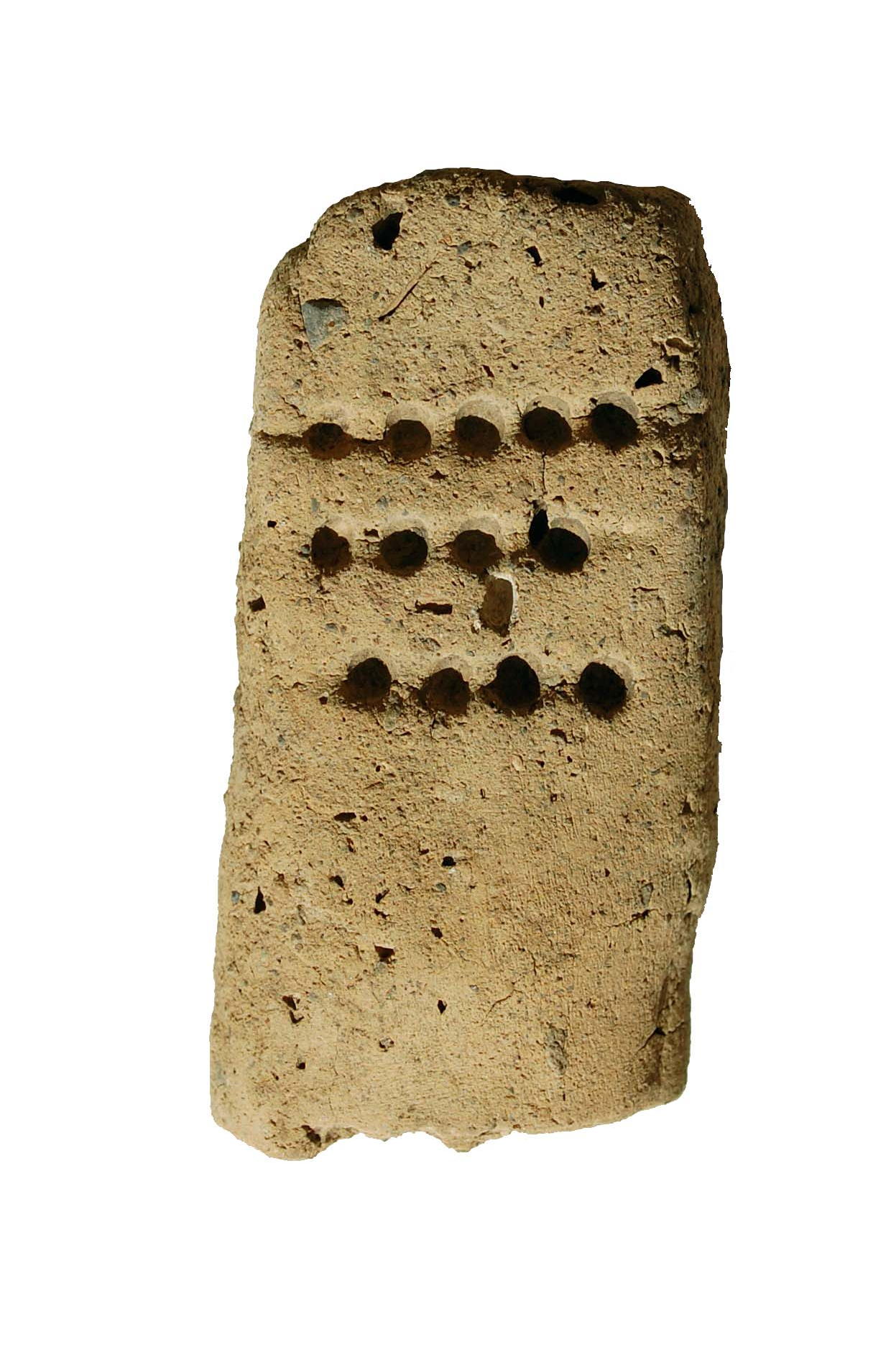
'Enigmatic tablet', associated with metallurgical activities

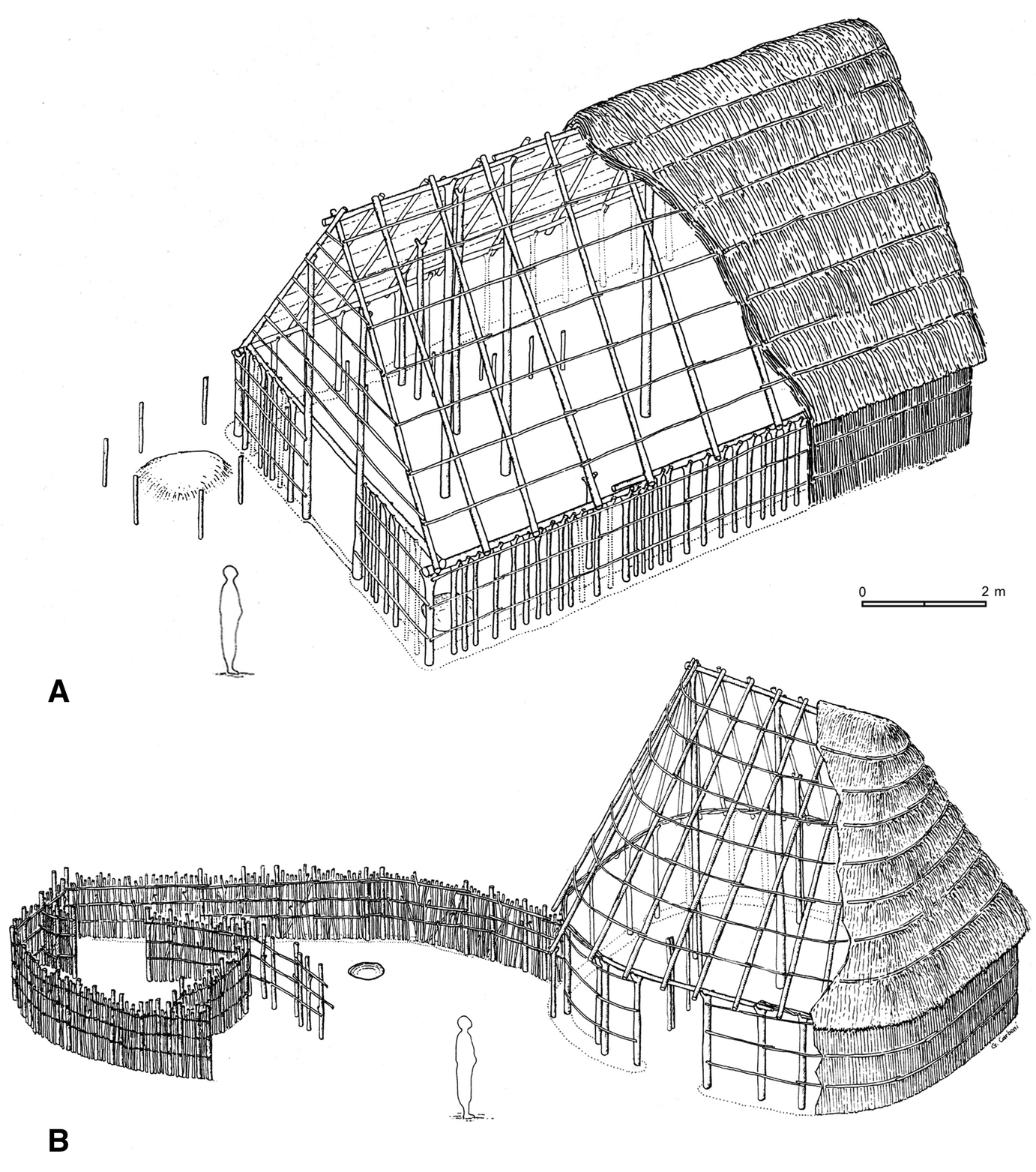
Copper Age houses in central Italy

=== Sicily ===
The Beaker was introduced in Sicily from Sardinia and spread mainly in the north-west and south-west of the island. In the northwest and in the Palermo kept almost intact its cultural and social characteristics, while in the south-west there was a strong integration with local cultures. The only known single bell-shaped glass in eastern Sicily was found in Syracuse.

=== Sardinia ===
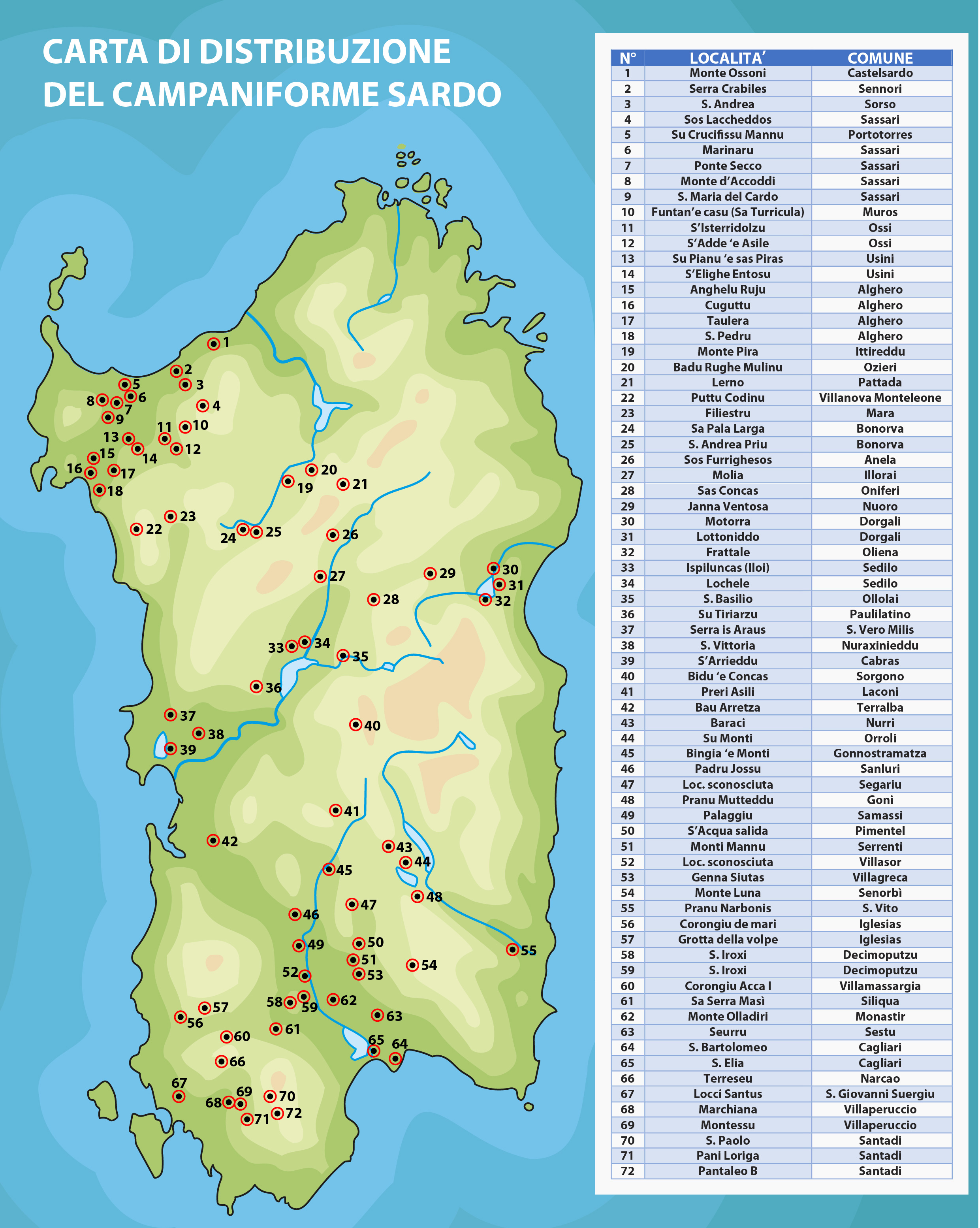
Beaker sites in Sardinia

In Sardinia, the Bell Beaker influence was more pronounced and long-lasting than on the Italian peninsula, contributing to the development of the local Bonnanaro culture.

Sardinia has been in contact with extra-insular communities in Corsica, Tuscany, Liguria and Provence since the Stone Age. From the late third millennium BCE on, comb-impressed Beaker ware, as well as other Beaker material in Monte Claro contexts, has been found (mostly in burials, such as Domus de Janas), demonstrating continuing relationships with the western Mediterranean. Elsewhere, Beaker material has been found stratigraphically above Monte Claro and at the end of the Chalcolithic period in association with the related Bronze Age Bonnanaro culture (1800–1600 BCE), for which C-14 dates calibrate to c. 2250 BCE. There is virtually no evidence in Sardinia of external contacts in the early second millennia, apart from late Beakers and close parallels between Bonnannaro pottery and that of the North Italian Polada culture.

Like elsewhere in Europe and in the Mediterranean area, the Bell Beaker culture in Sardinia (2100–1800 BCE) is characterised by the typical ceramics decorated with overlaid horizontal bands and associated finds: brassards, V-pierced buttons, etc. For the first time, gold items appeared on the island (torc of the tomb of Bingia 'e Monti, Gonnostramatza). The different styles and decorations of the ceramics which succeed through the period allow the division of the Beaker culture in Sardinia into three chronological phases: A1 (2100–2000 BCE), A2 (2000–1900 BCE), and B (1900–1800 BCE). In these various phases is observable the succession of two components of different geographical origin: the first Franco-Iberian, and the second Central European.

It appears likely that Sardinia was the intermediary that brought Beaker culture to Sicily.

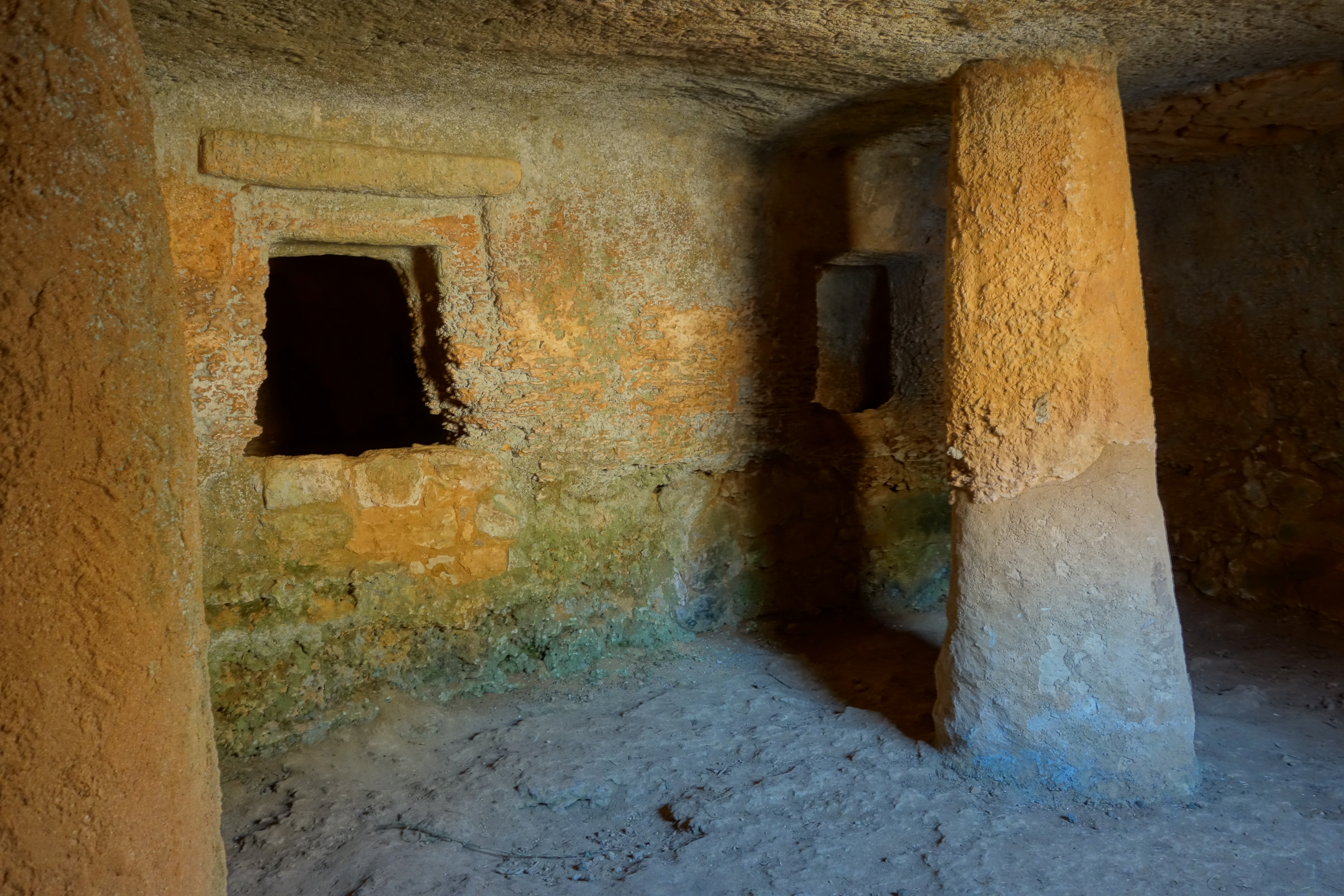
Domus de Janas tomb, Sardinia

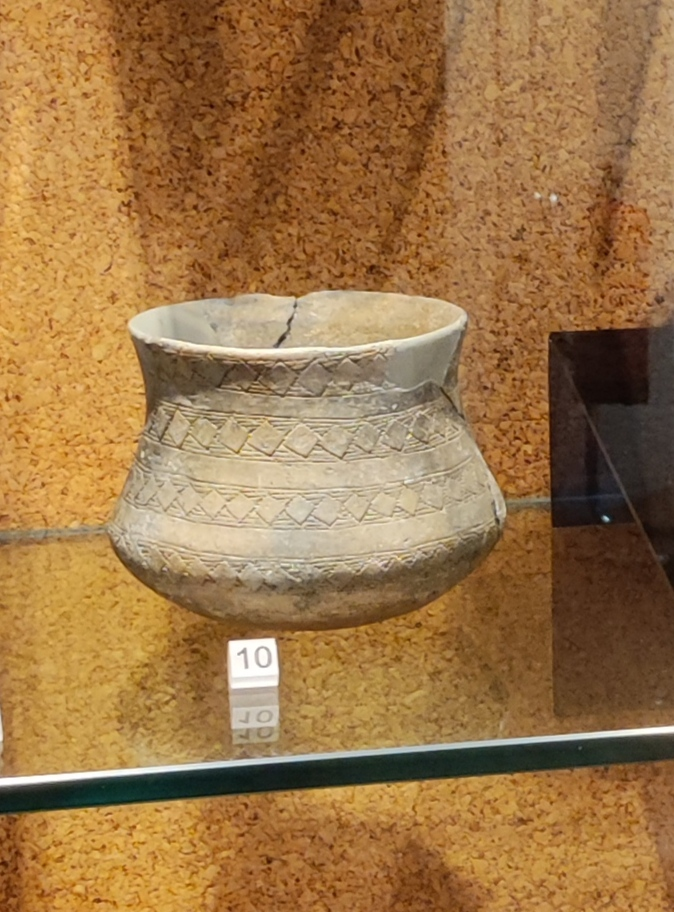
Beaker, necropolis of Anghelu Ruju, Sardinia

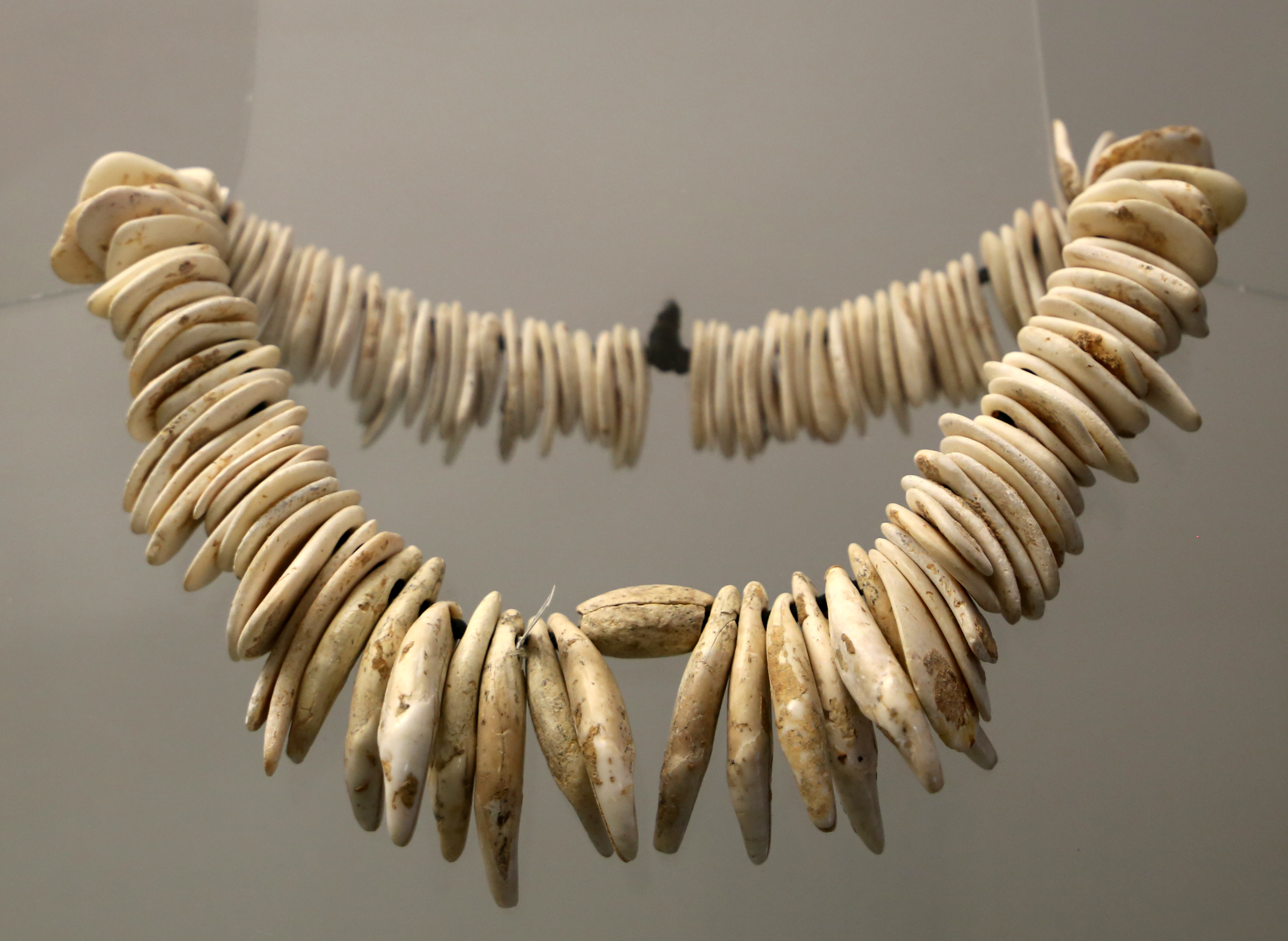
Animal tooth necklace from the necropolis of Is Loccis-Santus, Sardinia

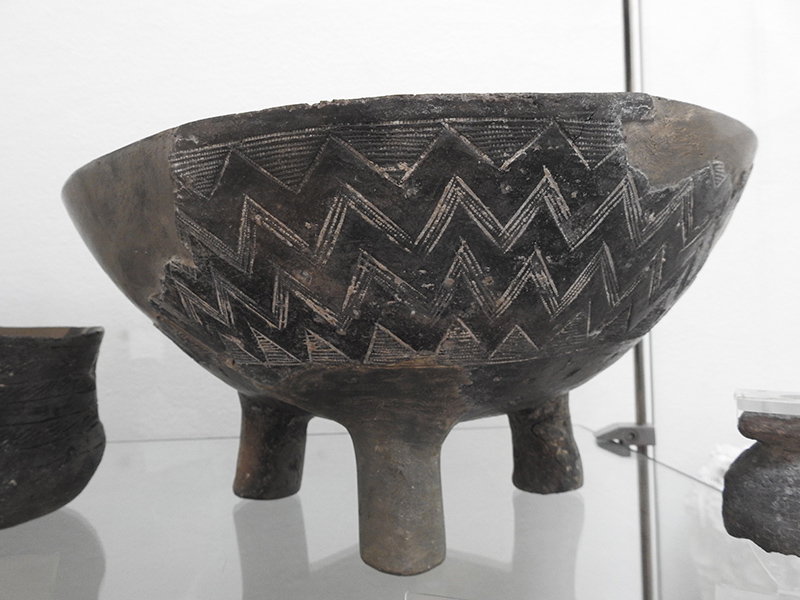
Tripod bowl, necropolis of Santu Pedru, Sardinia

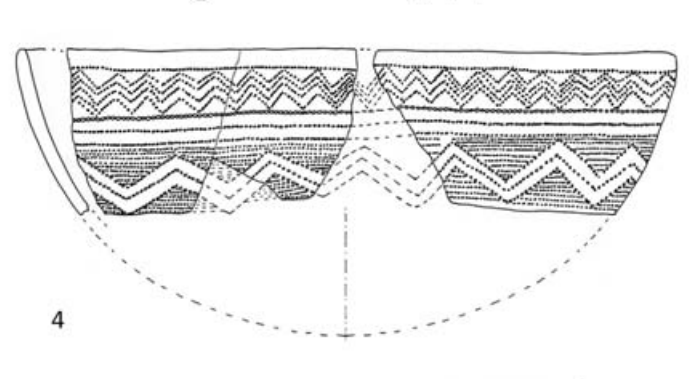
Bell Beaker bowl from Monte d'Accoddi.

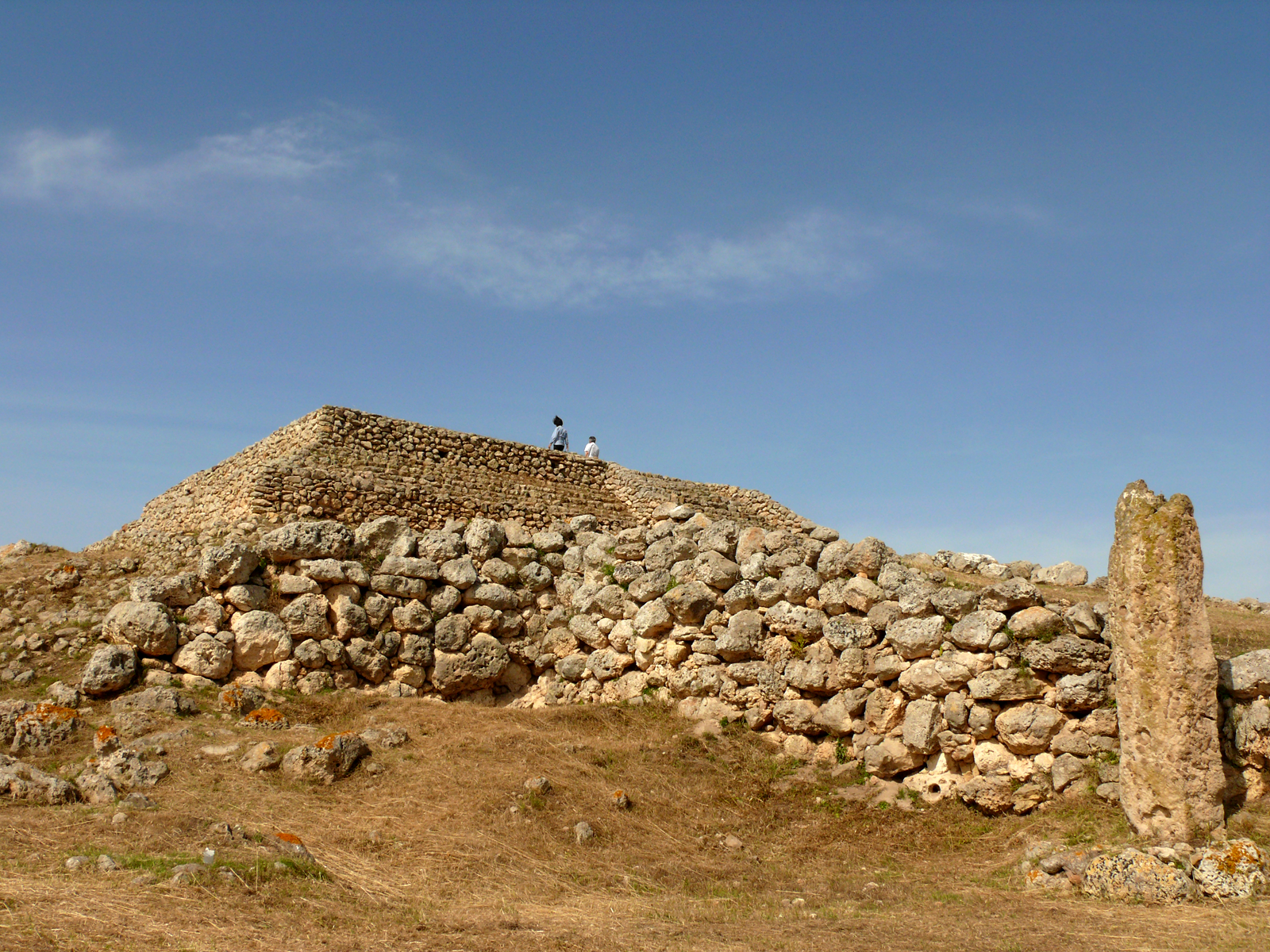
The site of Monte d'Accoddi was reused in the Beaker period

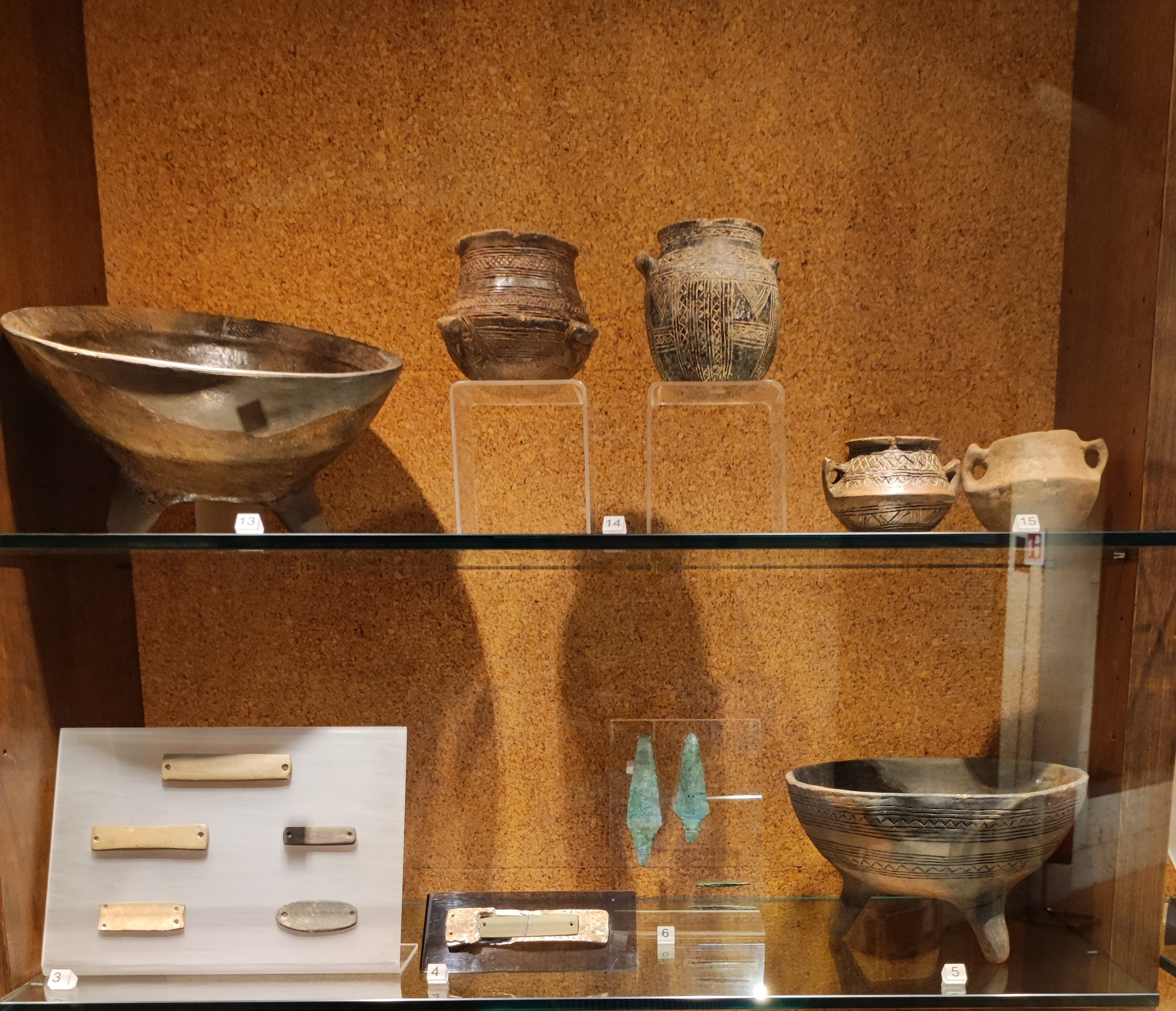
Pottery, wristguards and metal daggers.

=== Greece ===
Bell Beaker artefacts appear in mainland Greece and the Aegean from c.2200–2000 BCE. According to Heyd (2013) and Maran (1998) this is explained by the movement of people from the Adriatic Cetina culture into Greece at the transition from Early Helladic II to III. The Cetina culture was a "syncretistic Bell Beaker culture", splitting off from the Adriatic variant of the Vučedol culture and at the same time incorporating Bell Beaker elements related to those in northern Italy. Kristiansen and Larsson (2005) suggest that migrants from both the Adriatic Cetina culture and the Danube area reached Greece in this period, the latter indicated by close similarities in pottery forms to the Mokrin and Nagyrev cultures. New and more intensive exchange of goods subsequently developed after 1900 BCE between Greece and Bell Beaker-derived cultures such as the Únětice culture in central Europe and the Wessex culture in Britain. According to Galaty et al. (2015) a 'warrior culture' including "ideas related to warrior aristocracy" spread from Europe to Greece through contact with the Cetina culture, along with the tradition of tumulus burial.

Close similarities between megalithic tholos tombs in western Europe (such as the Tholos de Alcalar 7 and Tholos de El Romeral in Iberia), which were either reused or constructed by Bell Beaker people, and the later Mycenaean tholos tombs in Greece (such as the Treasury of Atreus), have prompted some archaeologists to suggest a western influence on, or origin for, the Mycenaean tombs.

=== Scandinavia ===
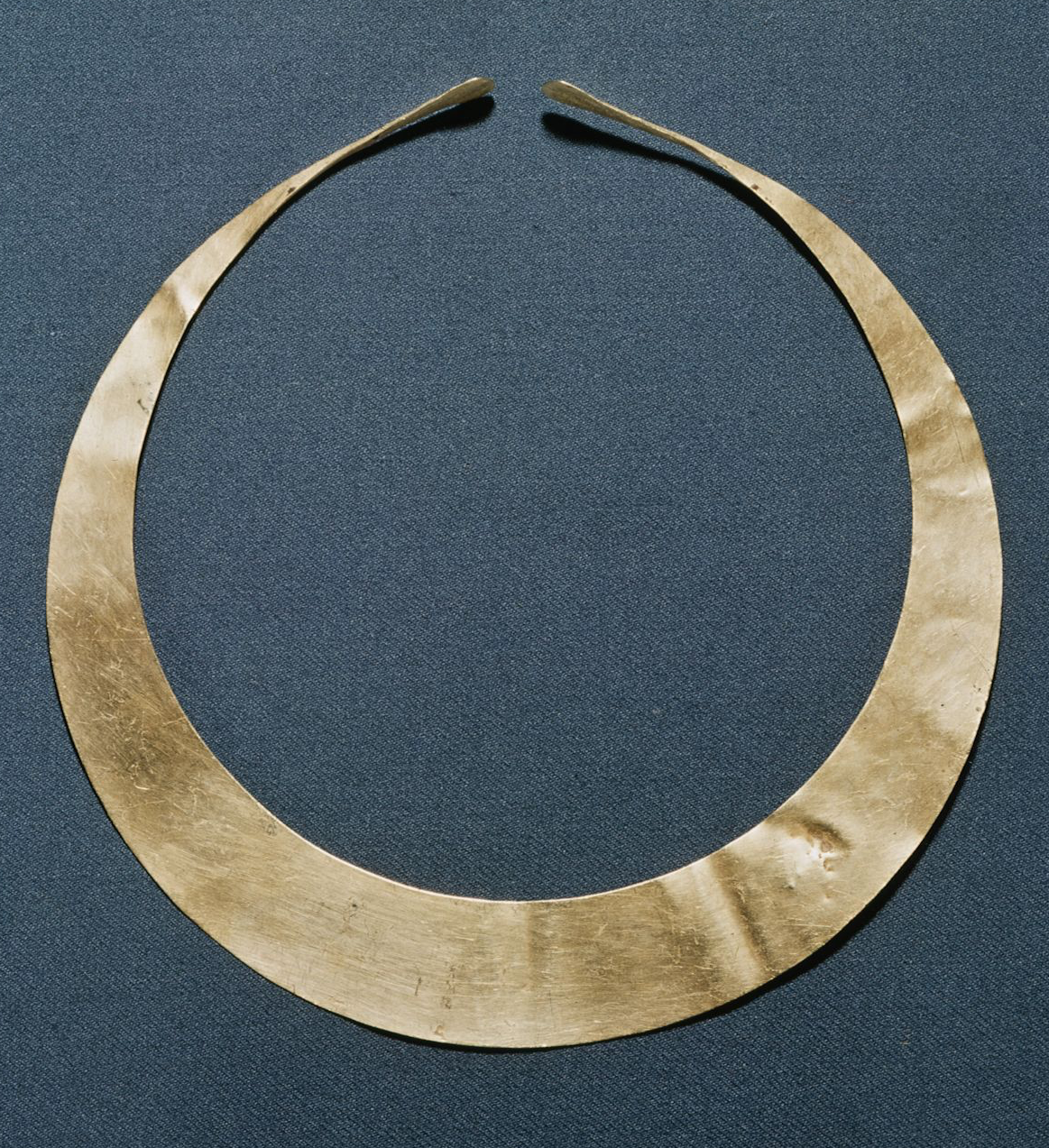
Gold lunula from Grevinge, Denmark, c.2350-1950 BCE.

In Denmark, large areas of forested land were cleared to be used for pasture and the growing of cereals during the Single Grave culture and in the Late Neolithic Period. Faint traces of Bell Beaker influence can be recognised already in the pottery of the Upper Grave phase of the Single Grave period, and even of the late Ground Grave phase, such as occasional use of AOO-like or zoned decoration and other typical ornamentation, while Bell Beaker associated objects such as wristguards and small copper trinkets, also found their way into this northern territories of the Corded Ware Culture. Domestic sites with Beakers only appear 200–300 years after the first appearance of Bell Beakers in Europe, at the early part of the Danish Late Neolithic Period (LN I) starting at 2350 BCE. These sites are concentrated in northern Jutland around the Limfjord and on the Djursland peninsula, largely contemporary to the local Upper Grave Period. In east central Sweden and western Sweden, barbed wire decoration characterised the period 2460–1990 BCE, linked to another Beaker derivation of northwestern Europe.

Three gold lunulae have been found in Denmark dating from the Bell Beaker period.

==== Stone and copper arms trade ====
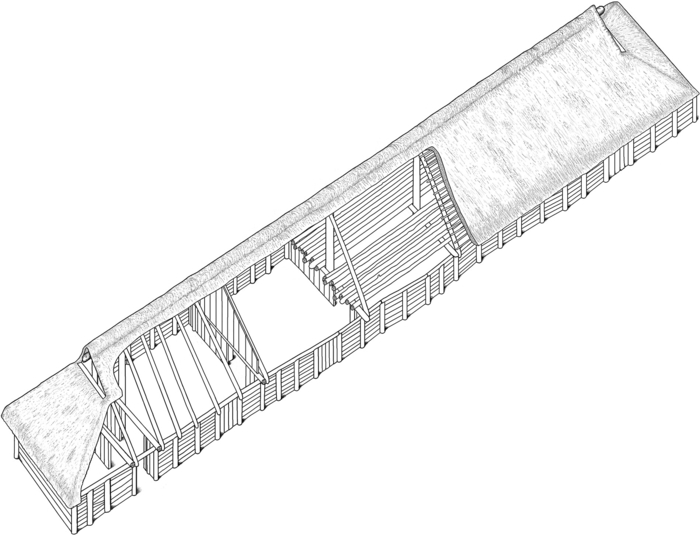
Late Neolithic/ Early Bronze Age house, Denmark, c.1900 BCE.

Northern Jutland has abundant sources of high quality flint, which had previously attracted industrious mining, large-scale production, and the comprehensive exchange of flint objects: notably axes and chisels. The Danish Beaker period, however, was characterised by the manufacture of lanceolate flint daggers, described as a completely new material form without local antecedents in flint and clearly related to the style of daggers circulating elsewhere in Beaker dominated Europe. Presumably Beaker culture spread from here to the remainder of Denmark, and to other regions in Scandinavia and northern Germany as well. Central and eastern Denmark adopted this dagger fashion and, to a limited degree, also archer's equipment characteristic to Beaker culture, although here Beaker pottery remained less common. This period in Scandinavian prehistory, from 2400 to 1800 BCE, is also known as the Dagger Period.

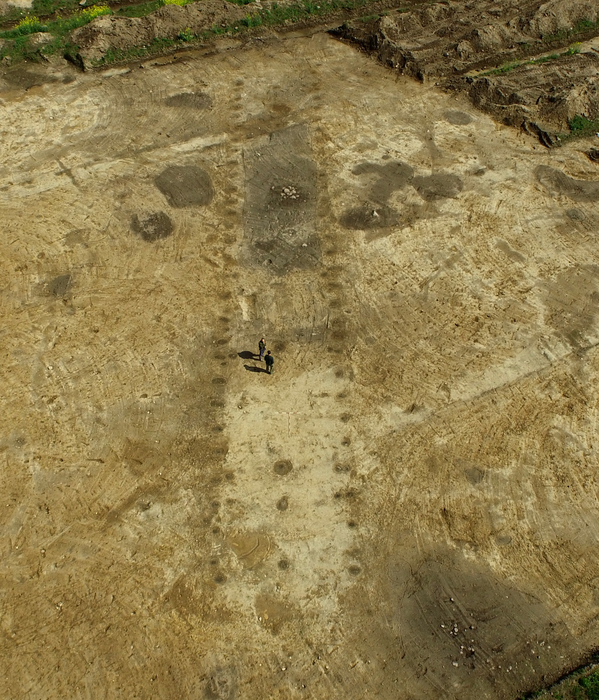
Late Neolithic/ Early Bronze Age house remains, Denmark, c. 1900 BCE.

The spread of metallurgy in Denmark is also intimately related to the Beaker representation in northern Jutland. The LN I metalwork is distributed throughout most of Denmark, but a concentration of early copper and gold coincides with this core region, hence suggesting a connection between Beakers and the introduction of metallurgy. Most LN I metal objects are distinctly influenced by the western European Beaker metal industry, gold sheet ornaments and copper flat axes being the predominant metal objects. The LN I copper flat axes divide into As-Sb-Ni copper, recalling so-called Dutch Bell Beaker copper and the As-Ni copper found occasionally in British and Irish Beaker contexts, the mining region of Dutch Bell Beaker copper being perhaps Brittany; and the Early Bronze Age Singen (As-Sb-Ag-Ni) and Ösenring (As-Sb-Ag) coppers having a central European – probably Alpine – origin.

==== Burial practices ====
In eastern Denmark and Scania one-person graves occur primarily in flat grave cemeteries. This is a continuation of the burial custom characterising the Scanian Battle-axe Culture, often to continue into the early Late Neolithic. Also in northern Jutland, the body of the deceased was normally arranged lying on its back in an extended position, but a typical Bell Beaker contracted position occurs occasionally. Typical to northern Jutland, however, cremations have been reported, also outside the Beaker core area, once within the context of an almost full Bell Beaker equipment.

==== Social transition ====
The introductory phase of the manufacture and use of flint daggers, c. 2350 BCE, must all in all be characterised as a period of social change. Apel argued that an institutionalised apprenticeship system must have existed. Craftsmanship was transmitted by inheritance in certain families living in the vicinity of abundant resources of high-quality flint. Debbie Olausson's (1997) examinations indicate that flint knapping activities, particularly the manufacture of daggers, reflect a relatively low degree of craft specialisation, probably in the form of a division of labour between households.

Noteworthy was the adoption of European-style woven wool clothes kept together by pins and buttons in contrast to the earlier usage of clothing made of leather and plant fibres. Two-aisled timber houses in Late Neolithic Denmark correspond to similar houses in southern Scandinavia and at least parts of central Scandinavia and lowland northern Germany. In Denmark, this mode of building houses is clearly rooted in a Middle Neolithic tradition. In general, Late Neolithic house building styles were shared over large areas of northern and central Europe. Towards the transition to LN II some farm houses became extraordinarily large.

==== Connections with other parts of the Beaker culture ====
Clusters of Late Neolithic Beaker presence similar to northern Jutland appear as pockets or "islands" of Beaker Culture in northern Europe, such as Mecklenburg, Schleswig-Holstein, and southern Norway. In northern central Poland Beaker-like representations even occur in a contemporary EBA setting. The frequent occurrence of Beaker pottery in settlements points at a large-scaled form of social identity or cultural identity, or perhaps an ethnic identity.

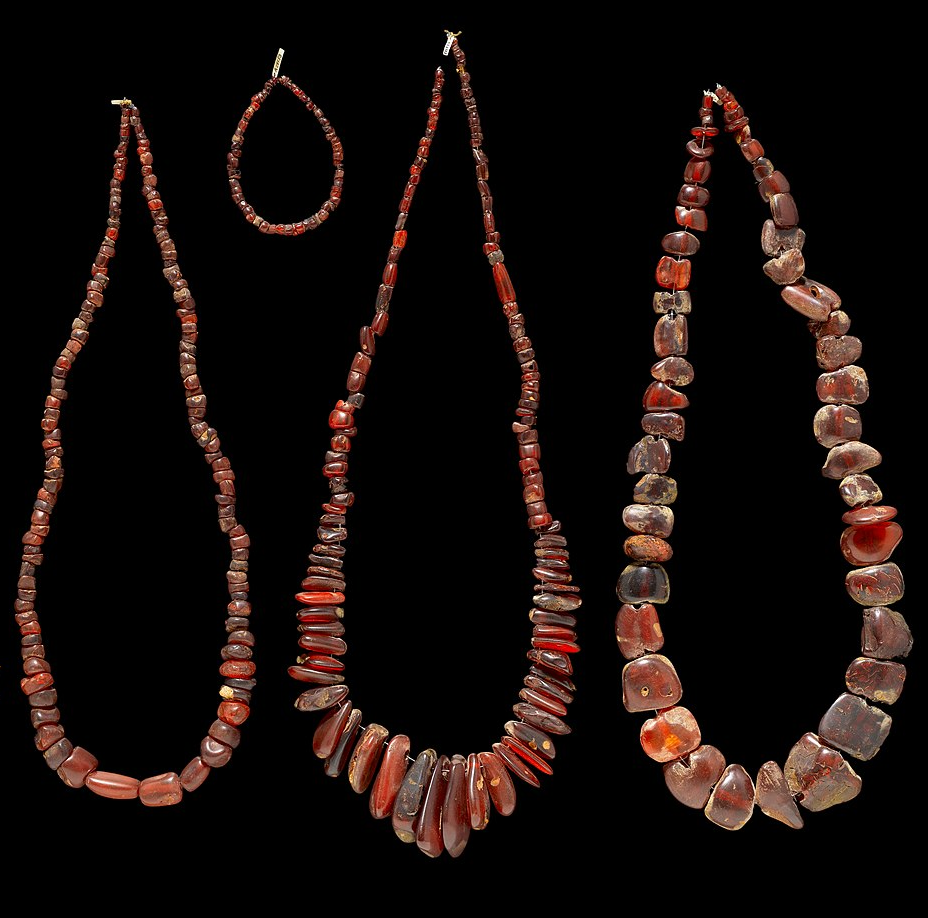
Amber, Denmark

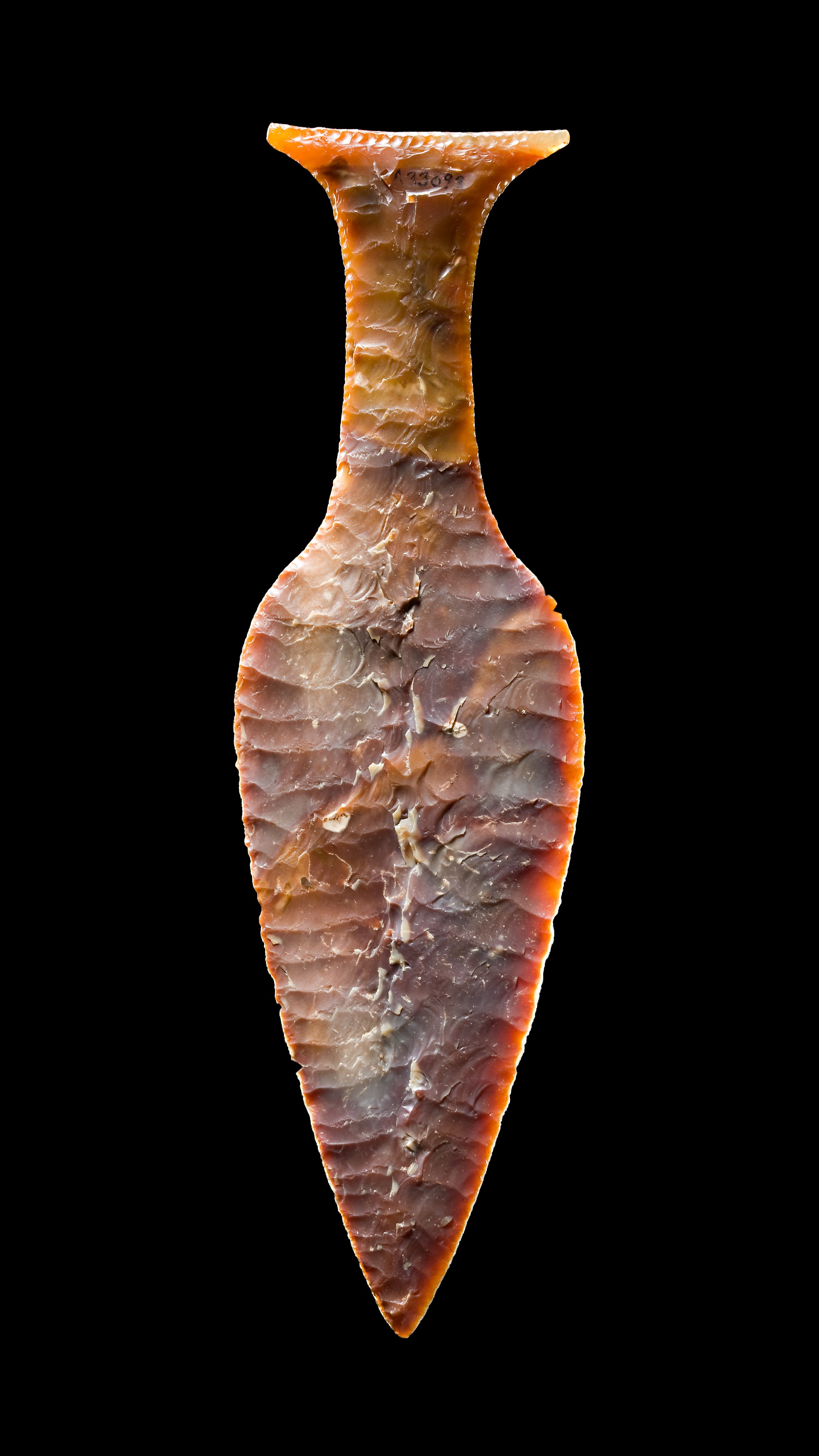
Hindsgavl flint dagger, Denmark, c. 1900 BCE

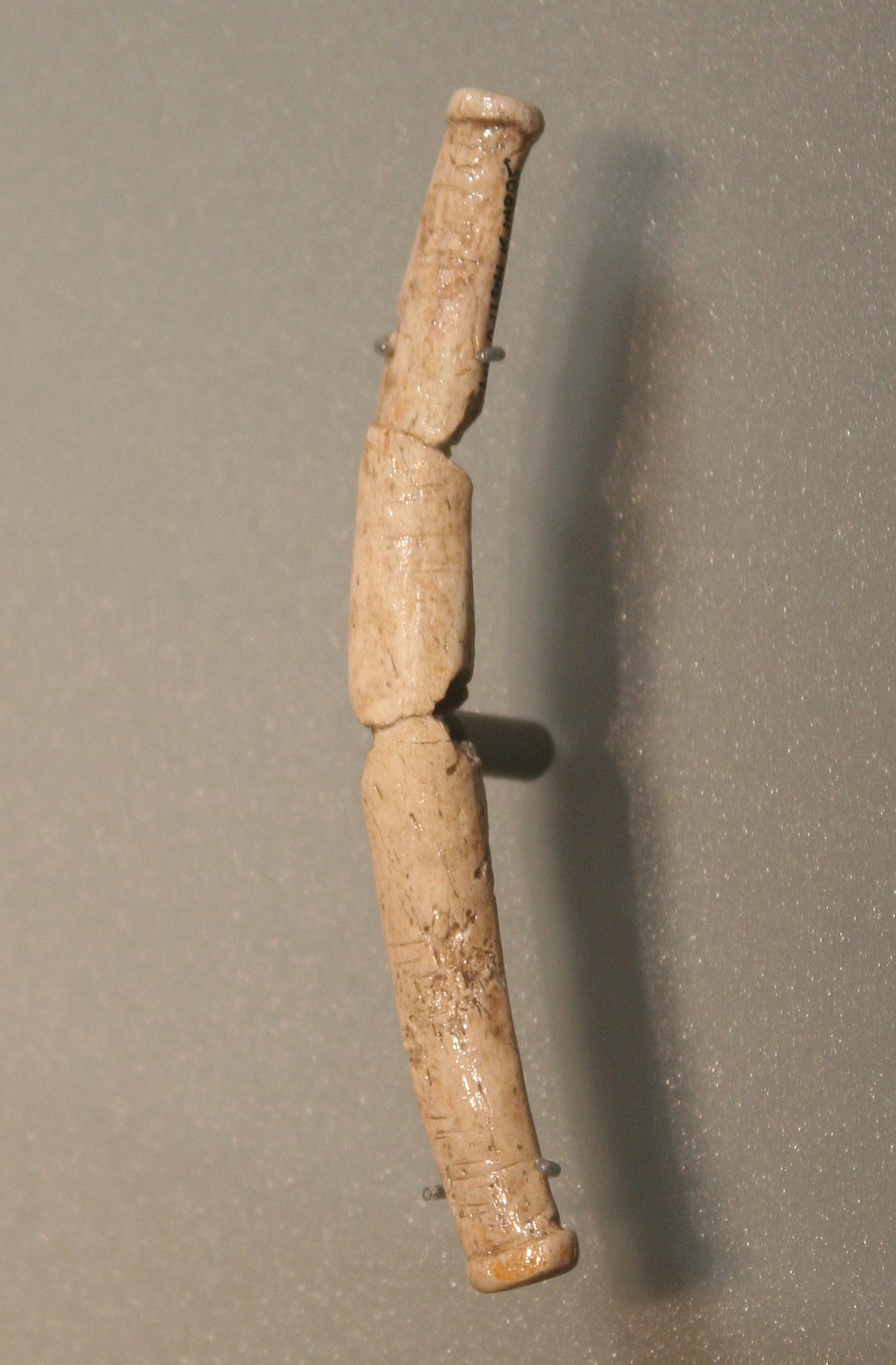
Bow-shaped pendant, northern Germany.

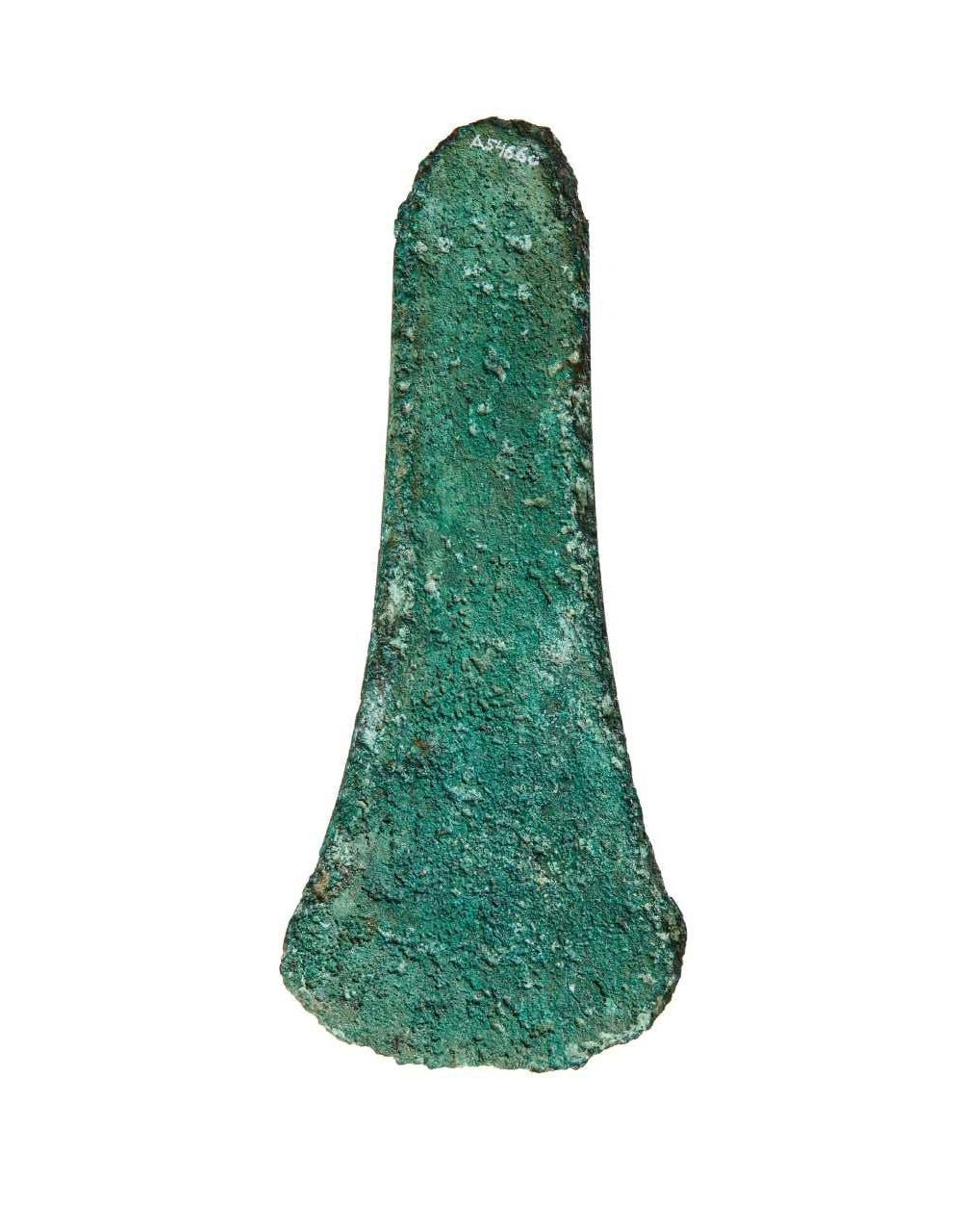
Bronze axe, Denmark, c. 1950 BCE

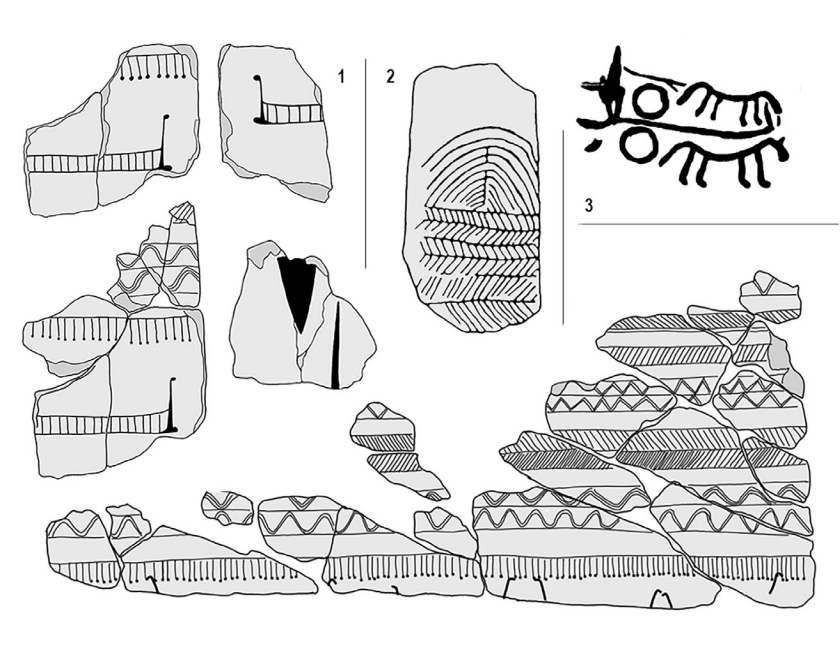
Stone steles with boat and cart images, Norway 3rd mill. BCE

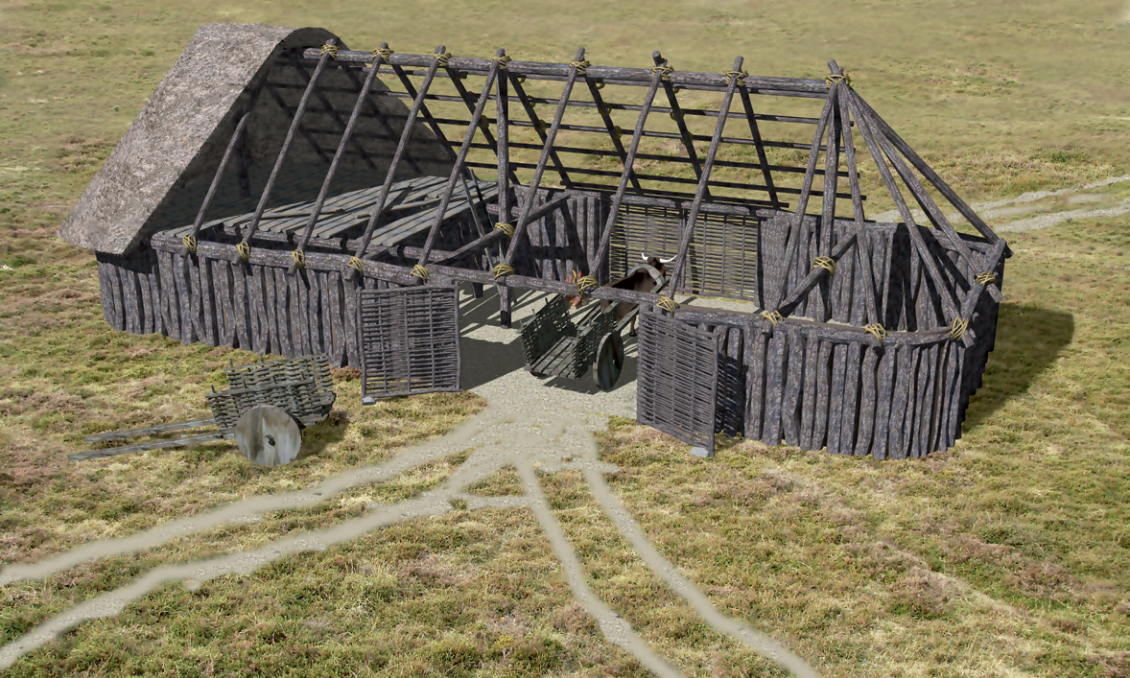
Reconstruction of a building at Østbirk, Denmark, c. 1800 BCE

=== Netherlands ===
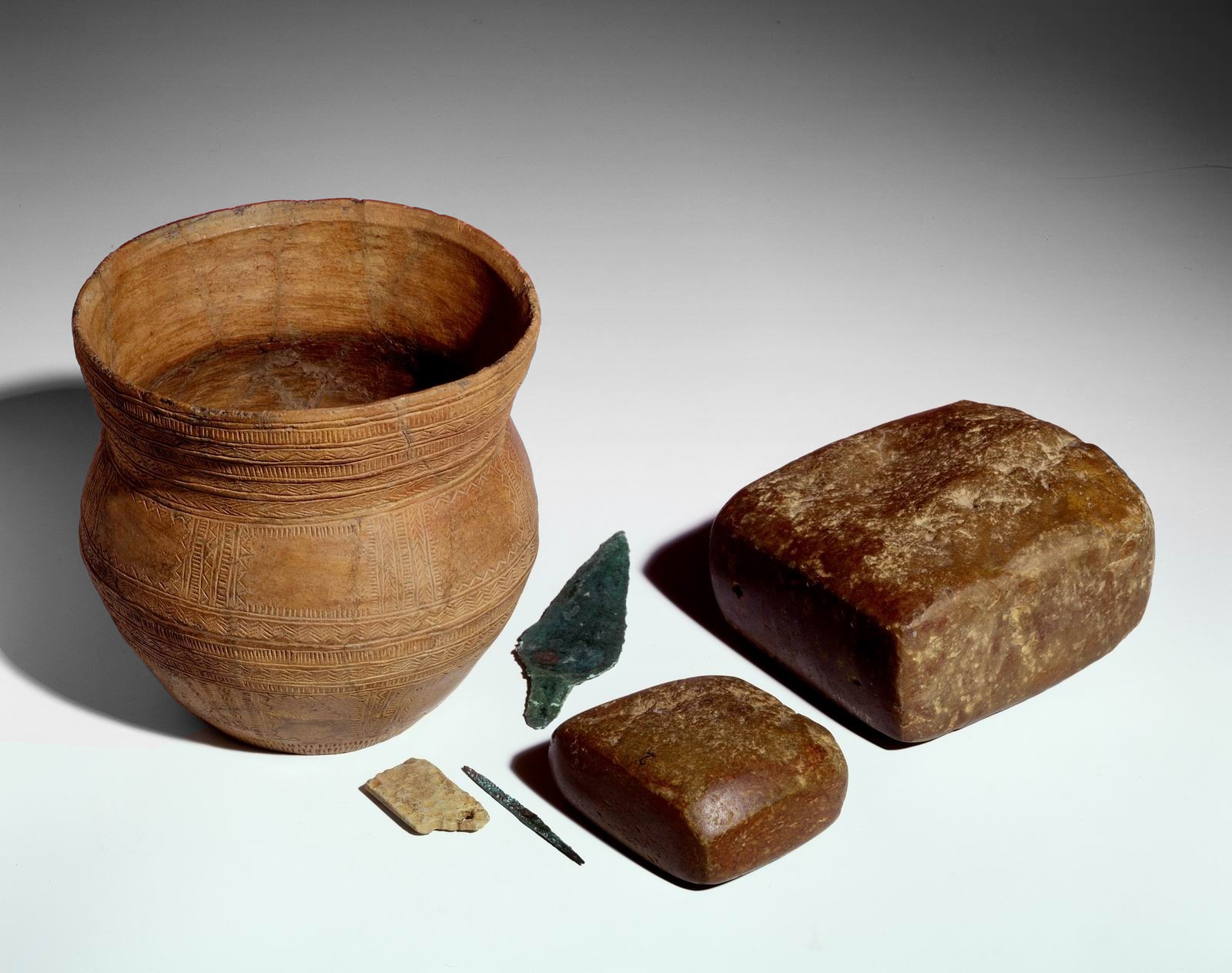
Bell Beaker, metal artefacts and cushion stones for metalworking

The Beaker group in northern Jutland forms an integrated part of the western European Beaker Culture, while western Jutland provided a link between the Lower Rhine area and northern Jutland. The local fine-ware pottery of Beaker derivation reveal links with other Beaker regions in western Europe, most specifically the Veluwe group at the Lower Rhine (Netherlands). Concurrent introduction of metallurgy shows that some people must have crossed cultural boundaries. Danish Beakers are contemporary with the earliest Early Bronze Age (EBA) of the East Group of Bell Beakers in central Europe, and with the floruit of Beaker cultures of the West Group in western Europe. The latter comprise Veluwe and Epi-Maritime in Continental northwestern Europe and the Middle Style Beakers (Style 2) in insular western Europe.

The interaction between the Beaker groups on the Veluwe Plain and in Jutland must, at least initially, have been quite intensive. All-over ornamented (AOO) and All-over-corded (AOC), and particularly Maritime style beakers are featured, although from a fairly late context and possibly rather of Epi-maritime style, equivalent to the situation in the north of the Netherlands, where Maritime ornamentation continued after it ceased in the central region of Veluwe and were succeeded c. 2300 BCE by beakers of the Veluwe and Epi-Maritime style.

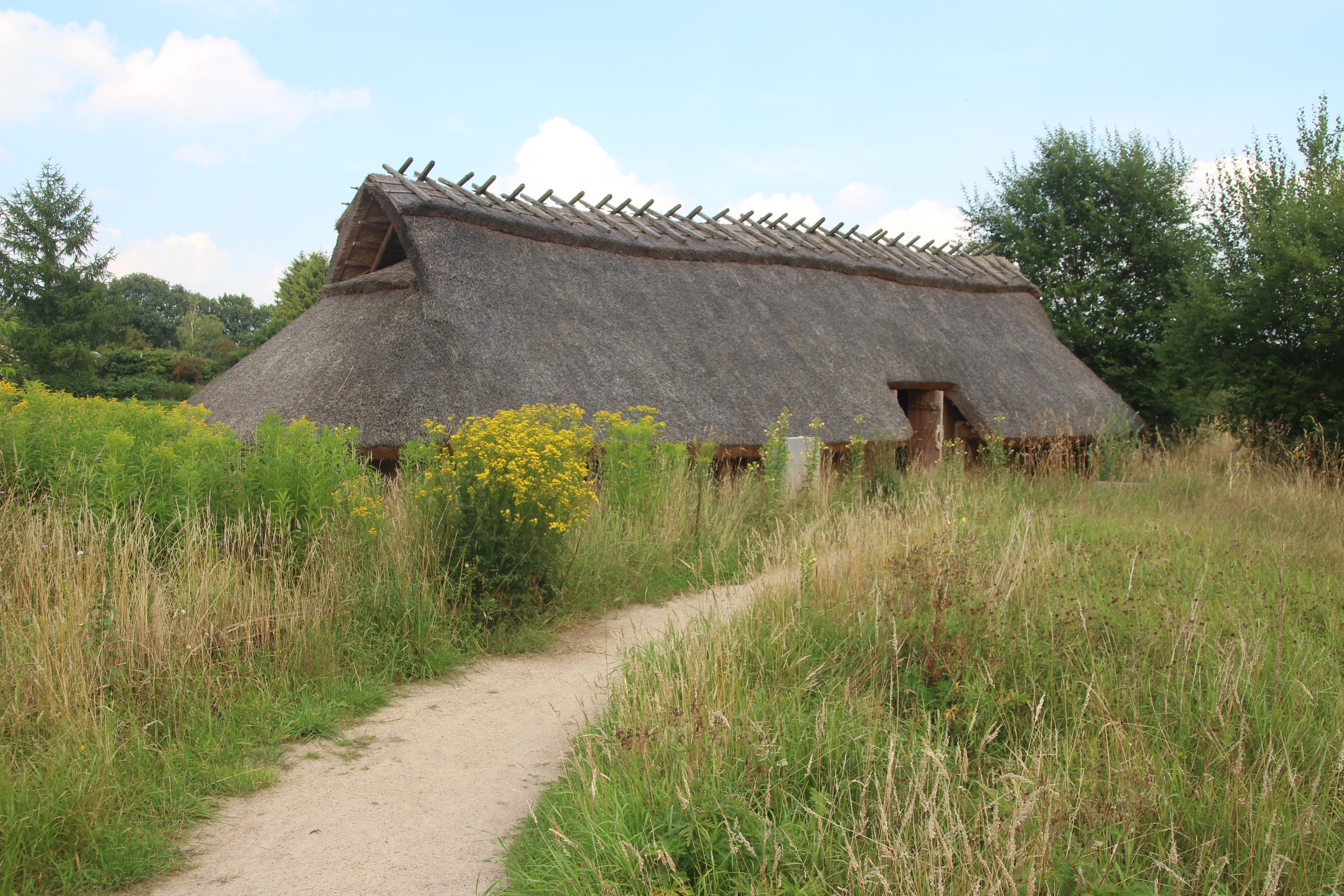
Bronze Age house reconstruction, Netherlands

In 2023 a large circular enclosure dating from c. 2000 BCE was discovered near the town of Tiel in the province of Gelderland. Described as the "Stonehenge of the Netherlands", the enclosure consisted of earth banks and ditches with entrances aligned to the solstices and equinoxes. At the centre of the enclosure there was a burial mound containing numerous burials. According to the excavators the enclosure functioned as a solar calendar used to determine "important moments including festival and harvest days". Wooden longhouses and other burial mounds were found in the immediate vicinity of the site. A glass bead from Mesopotamia dating from c. 2000 BCE was also found in the enclosure, indicating that long-distance contacts already existed at this time.

A single gold lunula has been found in the Netherlands dating from the Bell Beaker period.

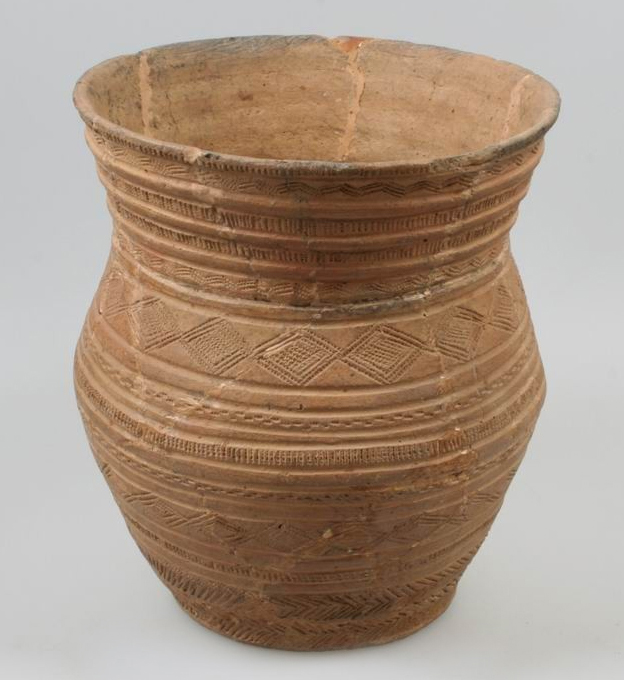
Bell Beaker, Netherlands

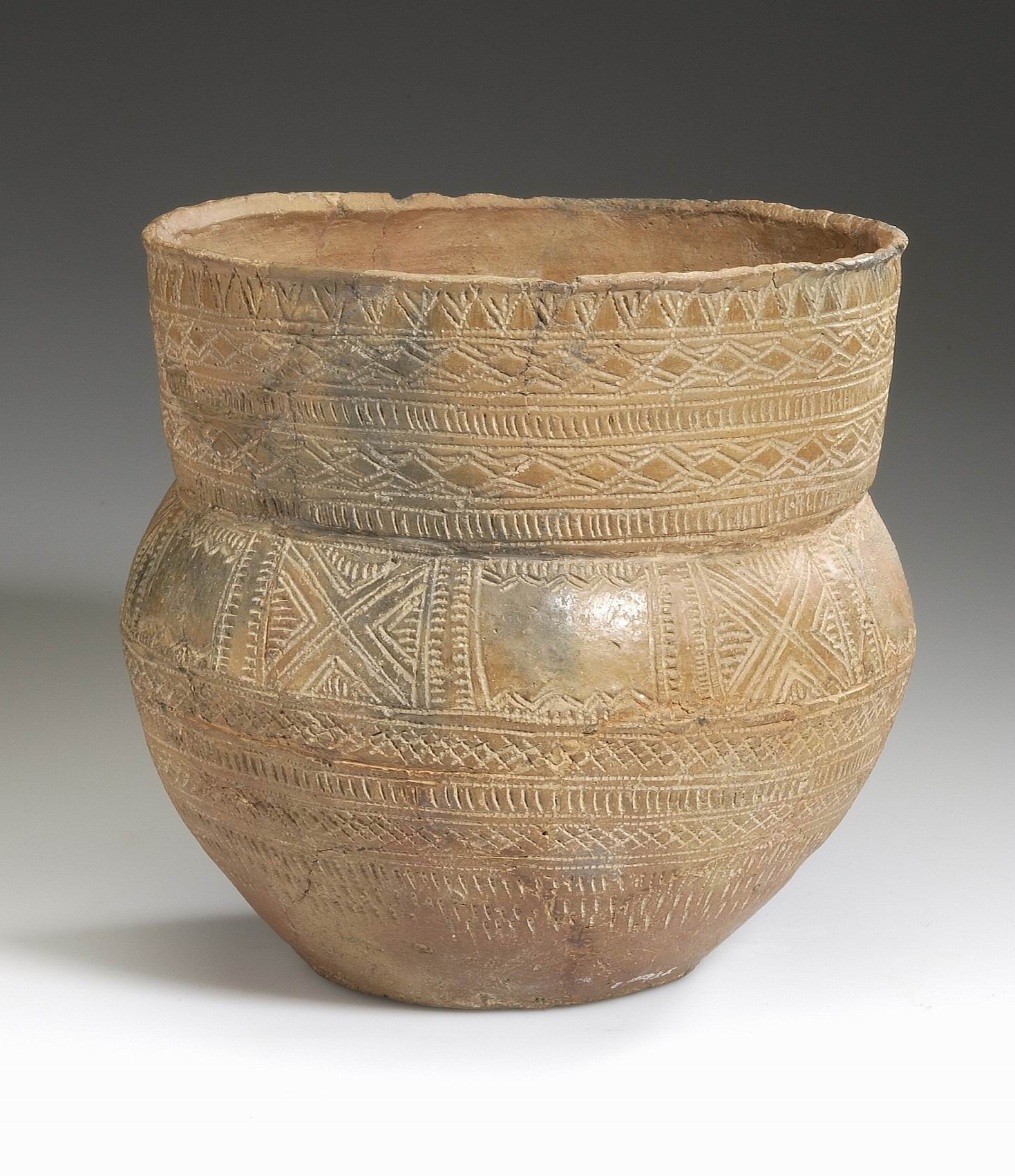
Bell Beaker ceramic, Netherlands

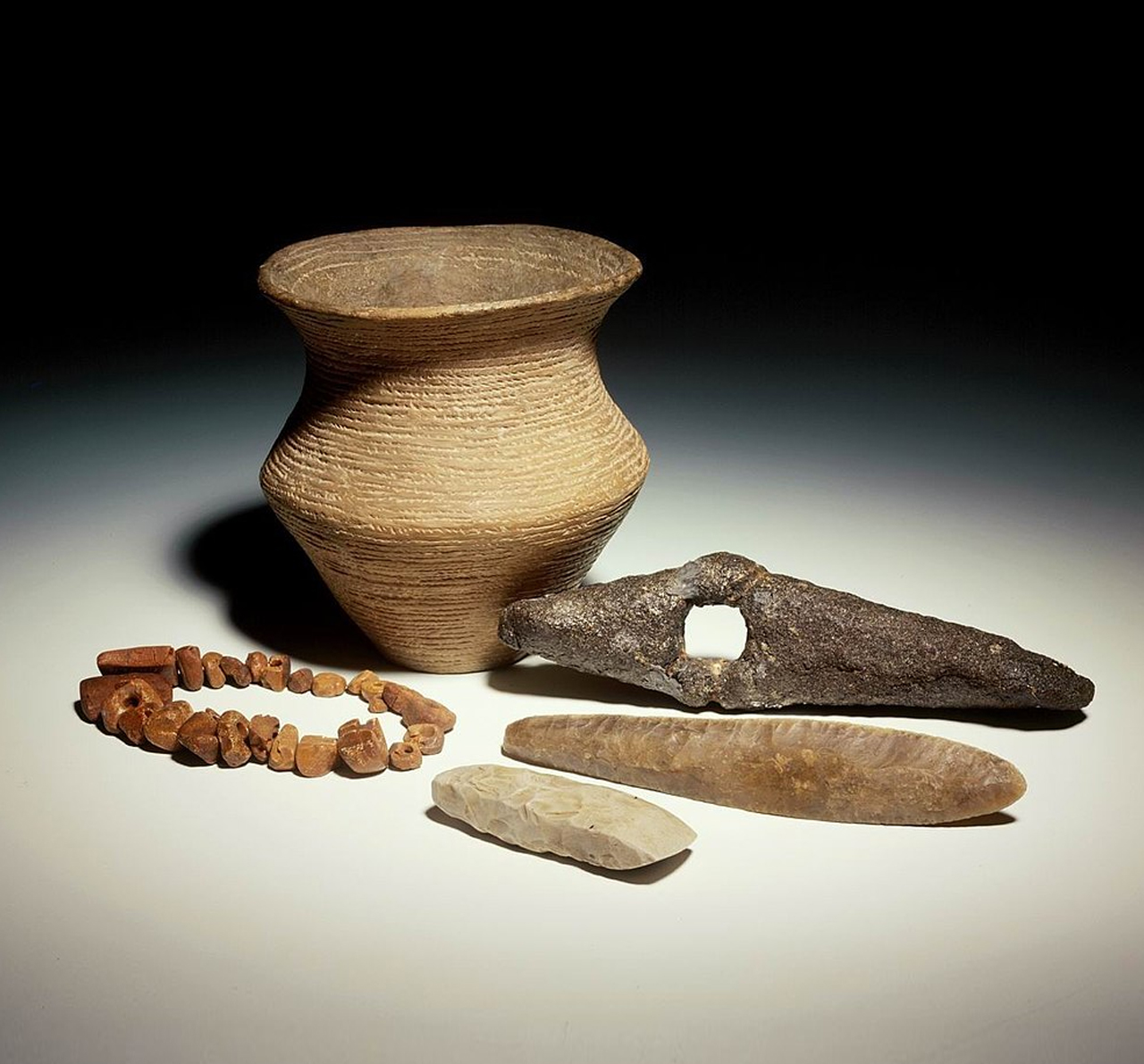
Beaker, amber, metal and stone tools

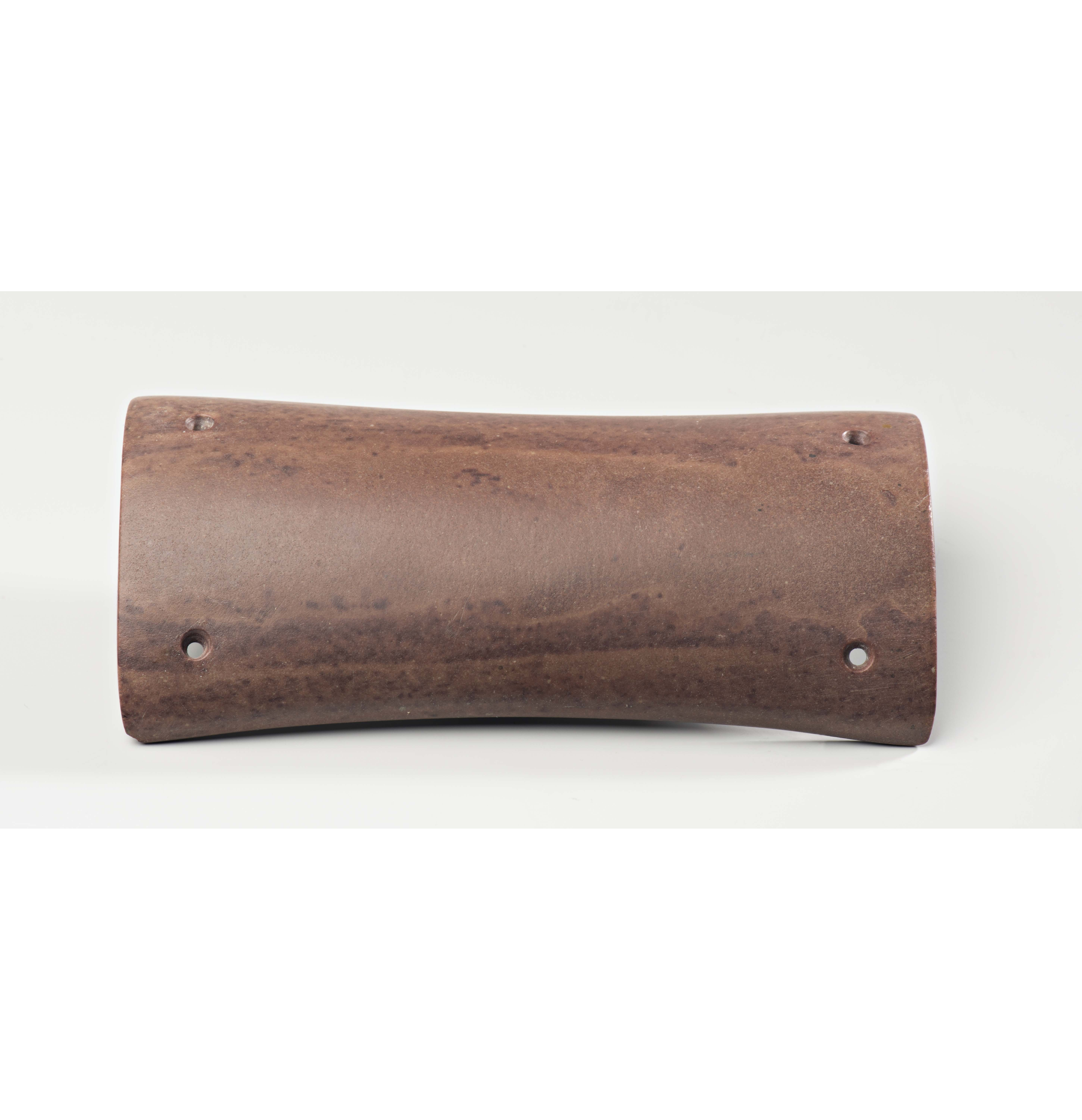
Stone wristguard, Netherlands

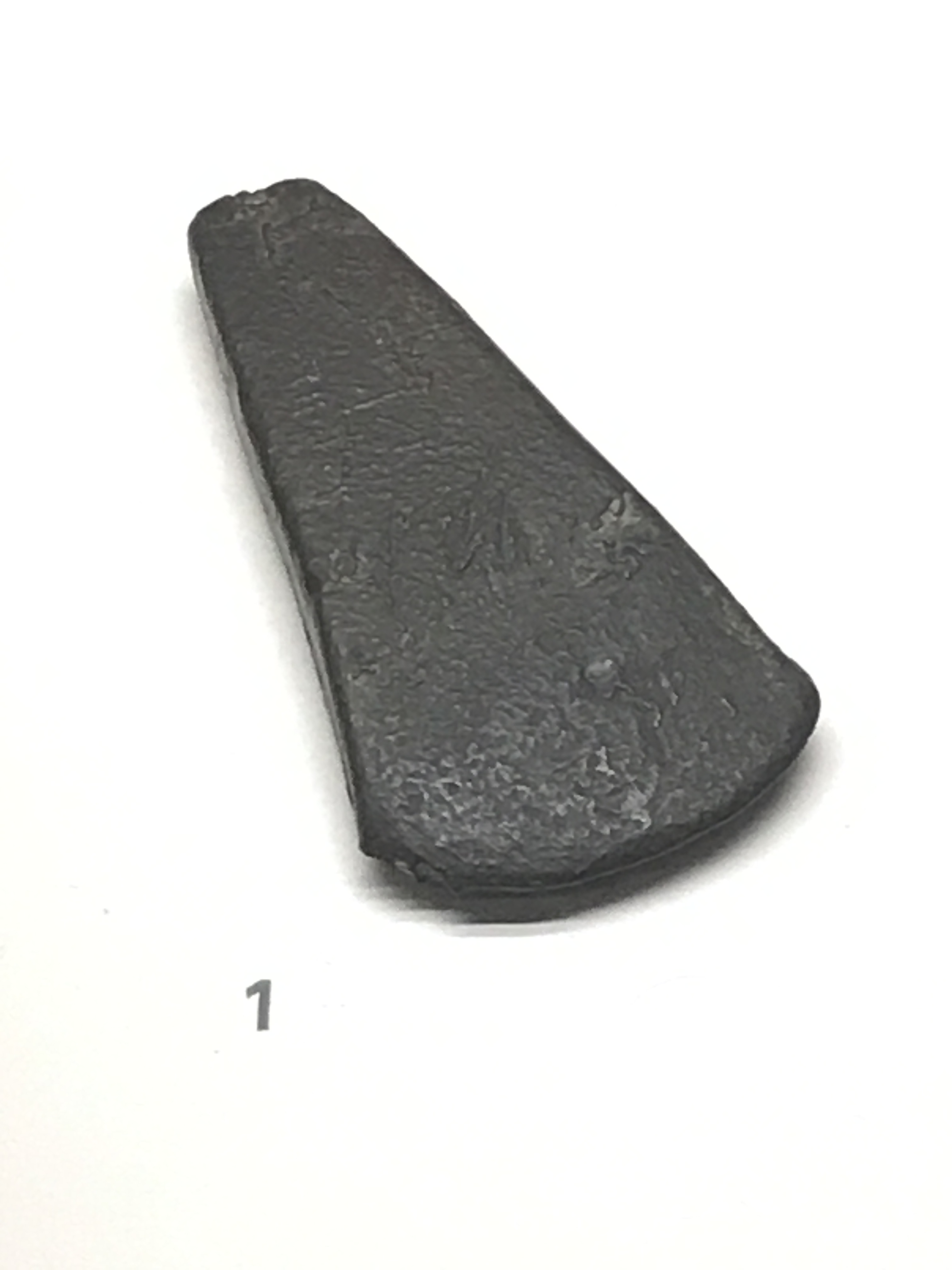
Copper axe, Netherlands

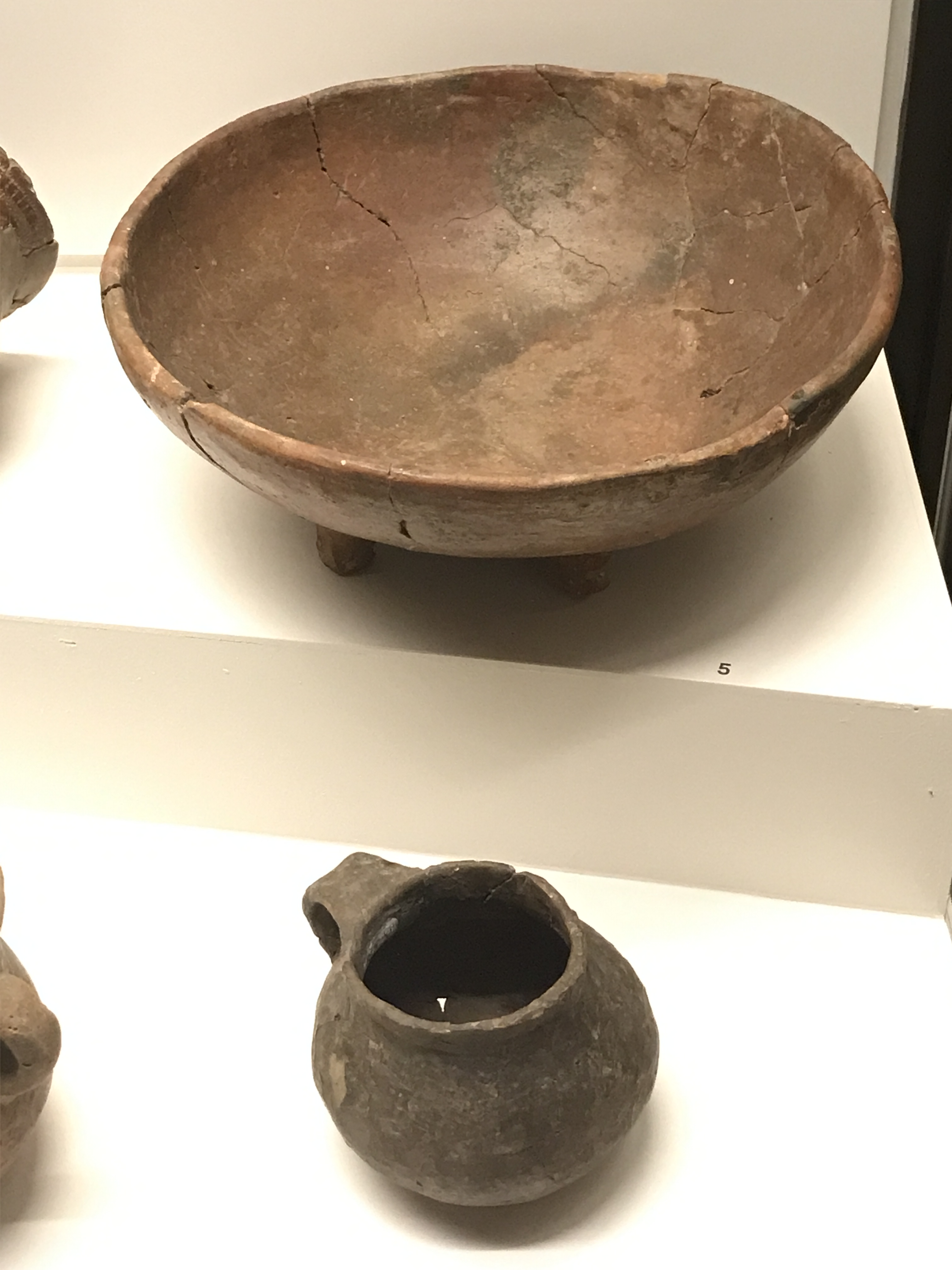
Footed bowl and jug

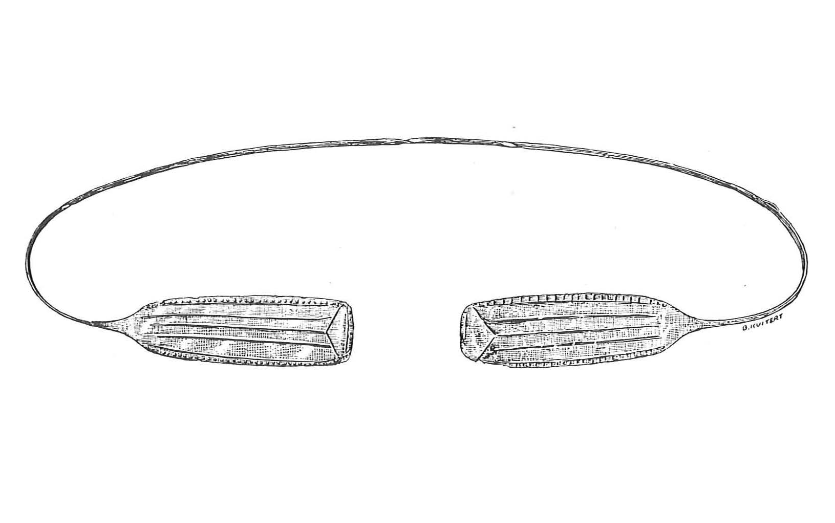
Gold ornament from Bennekom, Netherlands

=== End of a distinct Beaker culture ===
The cultural concepts originally adopted from Beaker groups at the lower Rhine blended or integrated with local Late Neolithic Culture. For a while the region was set apart from central and eastern Denmark, that evidently related more closely to the early Únětice culture across the Baltic Sea. Before the turn of the millennium the typical Beaker features had gone, their total duration being 200–300 years at the most.

A similar picture of cultural integration is featured among Bell Beakers in central Europe, thus challenging previous theories of Bell Beakers as an elitist or purely super-structural phenomenon. The connection with the East Group Beakers of Únětice had intensified considerably in LN II, thus triggering a new social transformation and innovations in metallurgy that would announce the actual beginning of the Northern Bronze Age.

== See also ==
- Beaker (disambiguation)
- Amesbury Archer
- Prehistoric Britain
- Prehistoric Iberia
- Bronze Age Britain
- Cornish Bronze Age
- Indo-European migrations

== Sources ==
- Bradley, Richard (2007). The prehistory of Britain and Ireland. Cambridge: Cambridge University Press. ISBN 978-0-521-84811-4.
- Case, Humphrey (2007). "Beakers and the Beaker Culture". In Burgess, Christopher; Topping, Peter; Lynch, Frances (eds.). Beyond Stonehenge: Essays on the Bronze Age in honour of Colin Burgess. Oxford: Oxbow. pp. 237–254. ISBN 978-1-84217-215-5.
- Cunliffe, Barry (2010). "Chapter 1: Celticization from the West: The Contribution of Archaeology". In Cunliffe, Barry; Koch, John T. (eds.). Celtic from the West: Alternative Perspectives from Archaeology, Genetics, Language and Literature. Oxford: Oxbow Books / Celtic Studies Publications. pp. 27–31. ISBN 978-1-84217-410-4.
- Fitzpatrick, A. P. (2013). "The arrival of the Beaker set in Britain and Ireland". In Koch, John T.; Cunliffe, Barry W. (eds.). Celtic from the West 2: Rethinking the Bronze Age and the Arrival of Indo-European in Atlantic Europe. Oxford: Oxbow Books. p. 44. ISBN 978-1-84217-529-3.
- Fokkens, Harry; Nicolis, Franco, eds. (2012). Background to Beakers: Inquiries in Regional Cultural Backgrounds of the Bell Beaker Complex. Leiden: Sidestone. ISBN 978-90-8890-084-6.
- Harrison, R.; Heyd, V. (2007). "The transformation of Europe in the third millennium BC: The example of 'Le Petit-Chasseur I + III' (Sion, Valais, Switzerland)". Praehistorische Zeitschrift. 82 (2): 129–214. doi:10.1515/pz.2007.010. S2CID 161404297.
- Flanagan, Laurence (1998). Ancient Ireland, Life before the Celts. Dublin: Gill & MacMillan. ISBN 978-0-7171-2433-6.
- Müller, Johannes; Hinz, Martin; Ulrich, Markus (2015). "6. Bell Beakers – Chronology, innovation and memory: A multivariate approach". In Maria Pilar Prieto Martinez; Laure Salanova (eds.). The Bell Beaker Transition in Europe: Mobility and local evolution during the 3rd millennium BC.
- Piggot, Stuart (1965). Ancient Europe from the Beginnings of Agriculture to Classical Antiquity: A Survey. Chicago: Aldine. ISBN 978-0-202-33002-0.
