= Le Petit-Chasseur =

Coordinates: 46.2318°N 7.3514°E

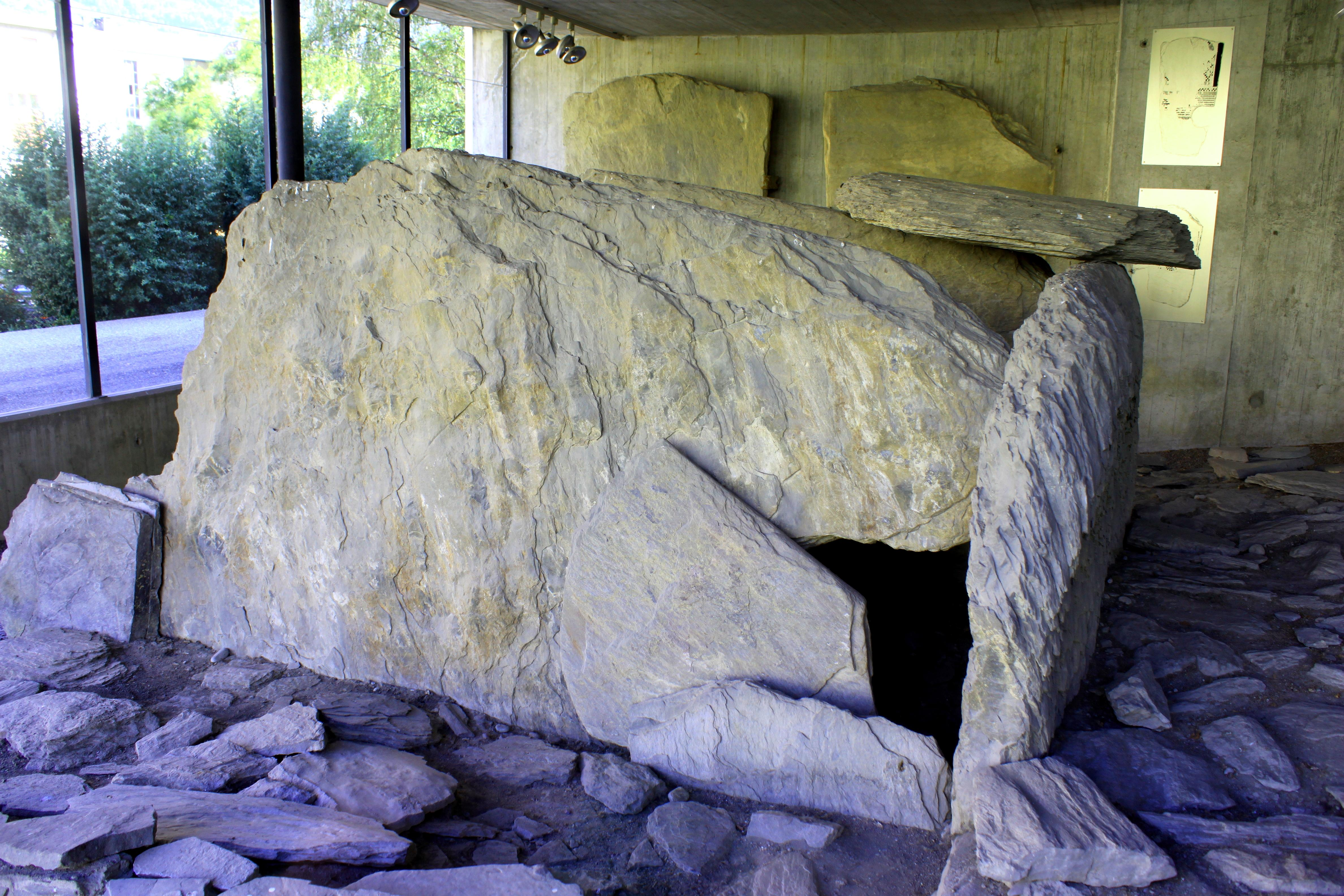
Dolmen

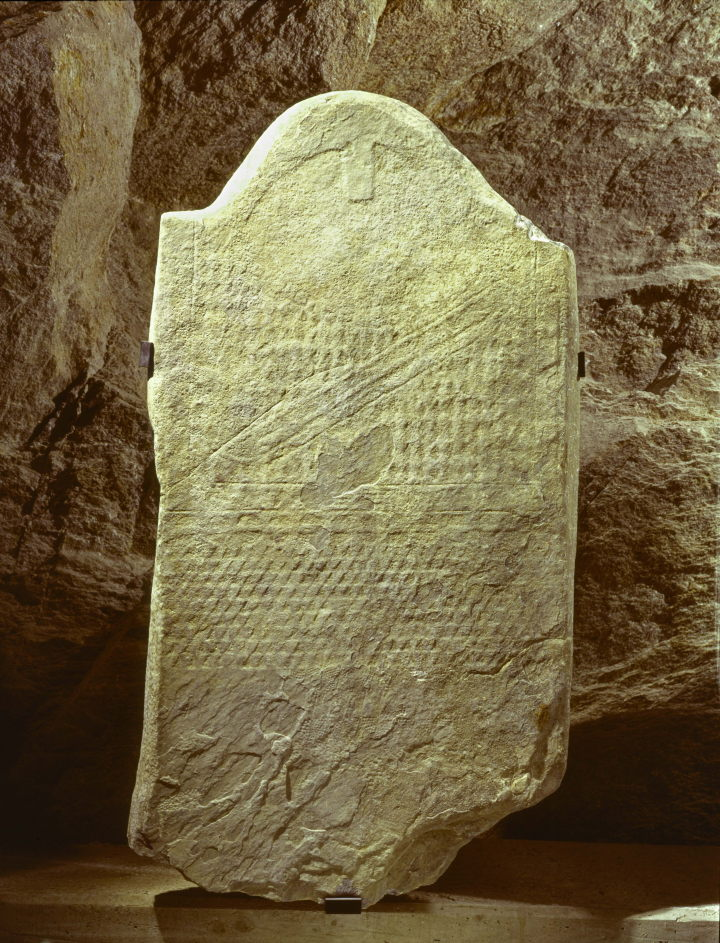
Anthropomorphic stela

Le Petit Chasseur is the name of a megalithic site in Sion, Valais, Switzerland. Discovered in 1960 or 1961, it consists of three dolmens, dated to between 2900 and 2200 BC. It is associated with the Saône-Rhône culture, part of the local late Chalcolithic phase (éolithique final valasian). The younger parts of the site are associated with the Bell Beaker horizon, including a cemetery with the remains of about 90 individuals (Dolmen M XII).

== Archaeological findings ==
Archaeologists found six aligned standing stones in La Petit, in July 2019. These standing stones were found accidentally during the construction work of a residential building, in the same area where 30 such stones and the dolmens were found in 1960 or 1961.

“This discovery is of prime importance to help us understand social rituals at the end of the Neolithic period (around 2,500BC) in central Europe,” was announced from the canton of Valais. According to the press release, a number of stones were noticed to have been intentionally broken.

Three of the standing stones were carved with markings. The largest of the stones assumed to be a male figure wearing geometrically decorated clothes with a sun-like motif around his face is about two tonnes.

== Gallery ==
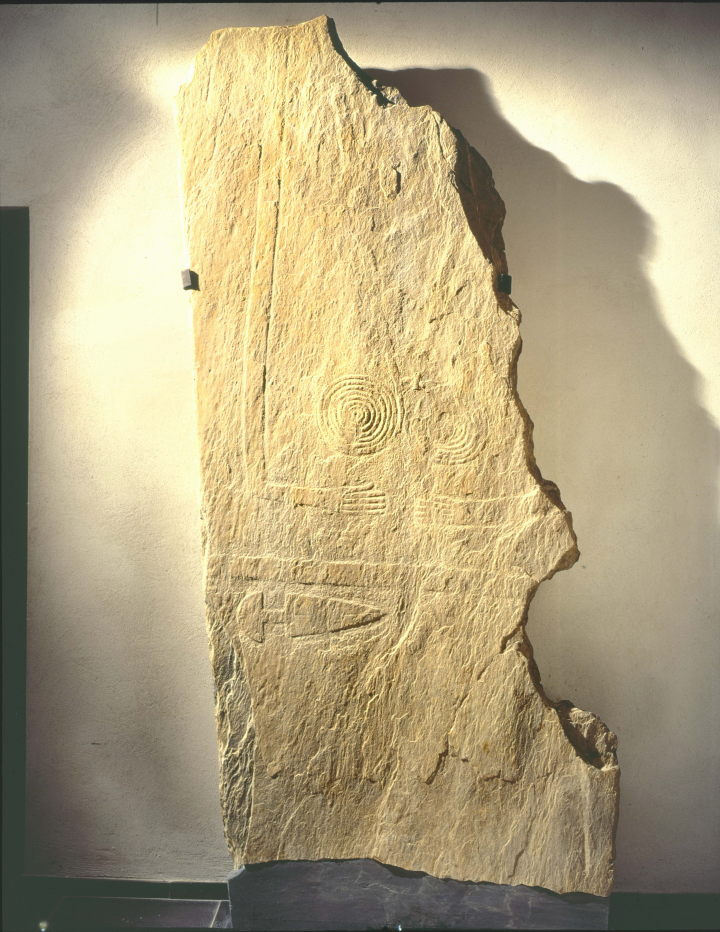
Anthropomorphic stele

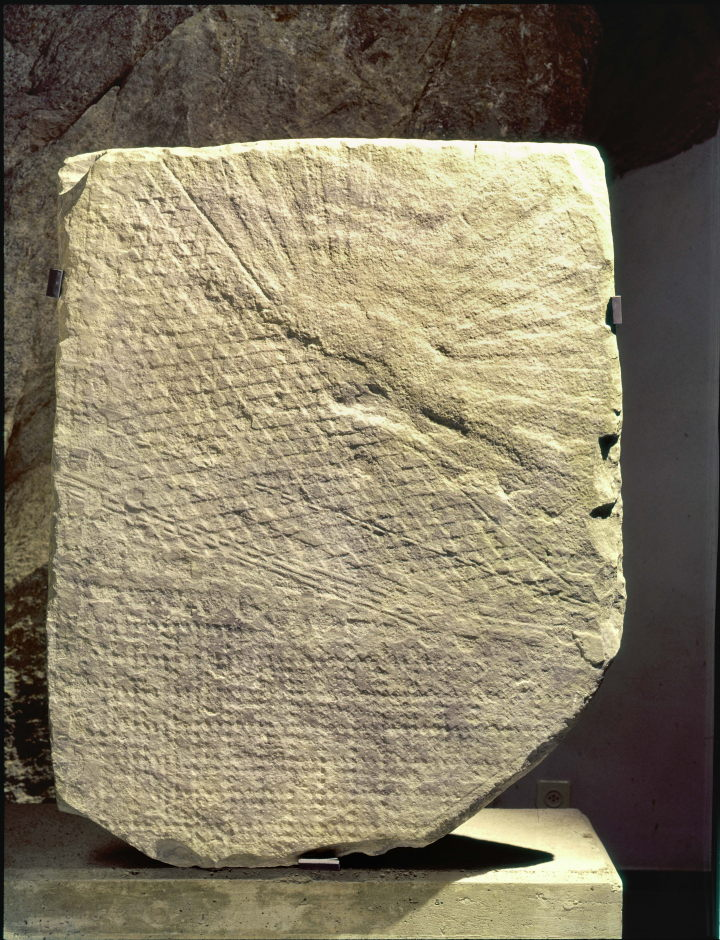

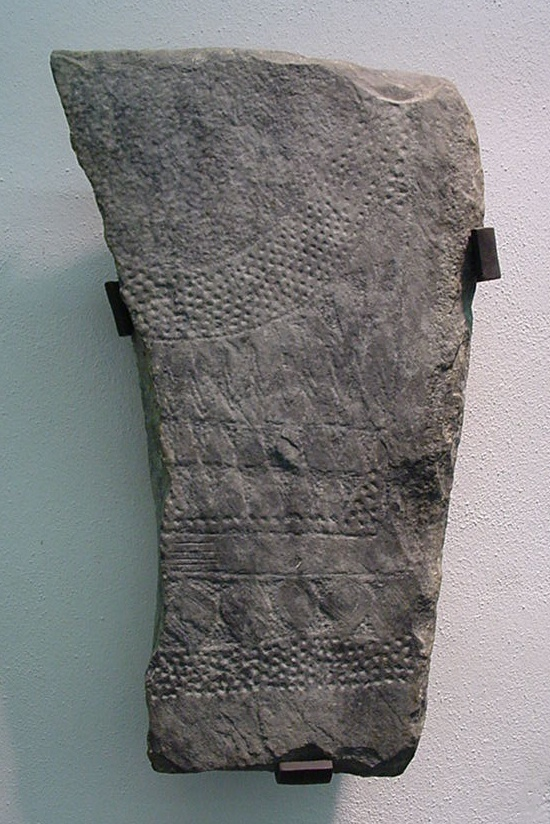

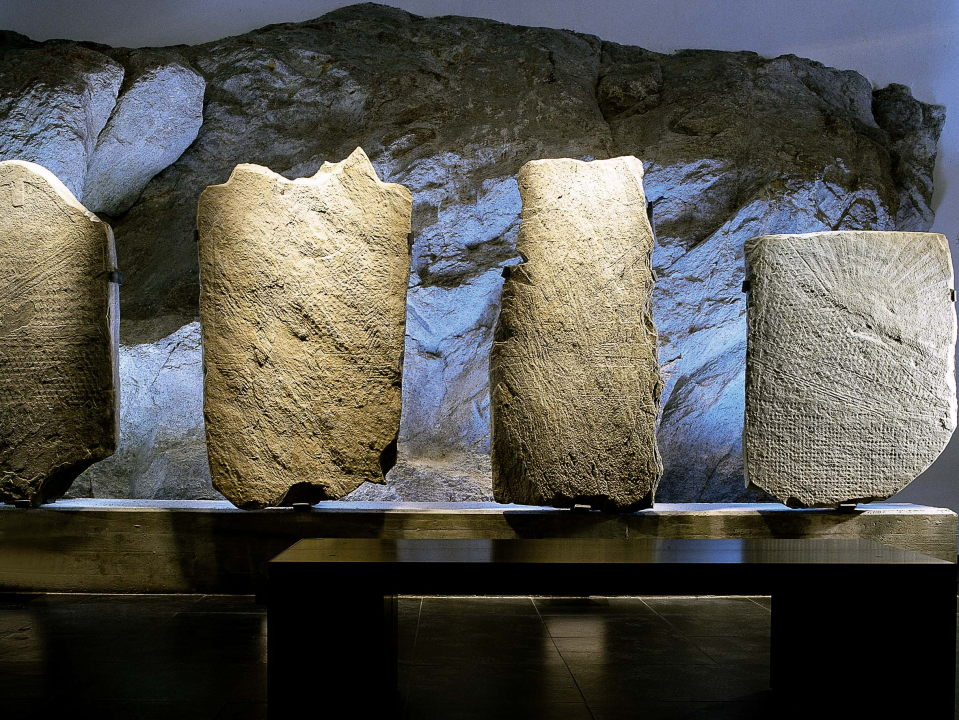

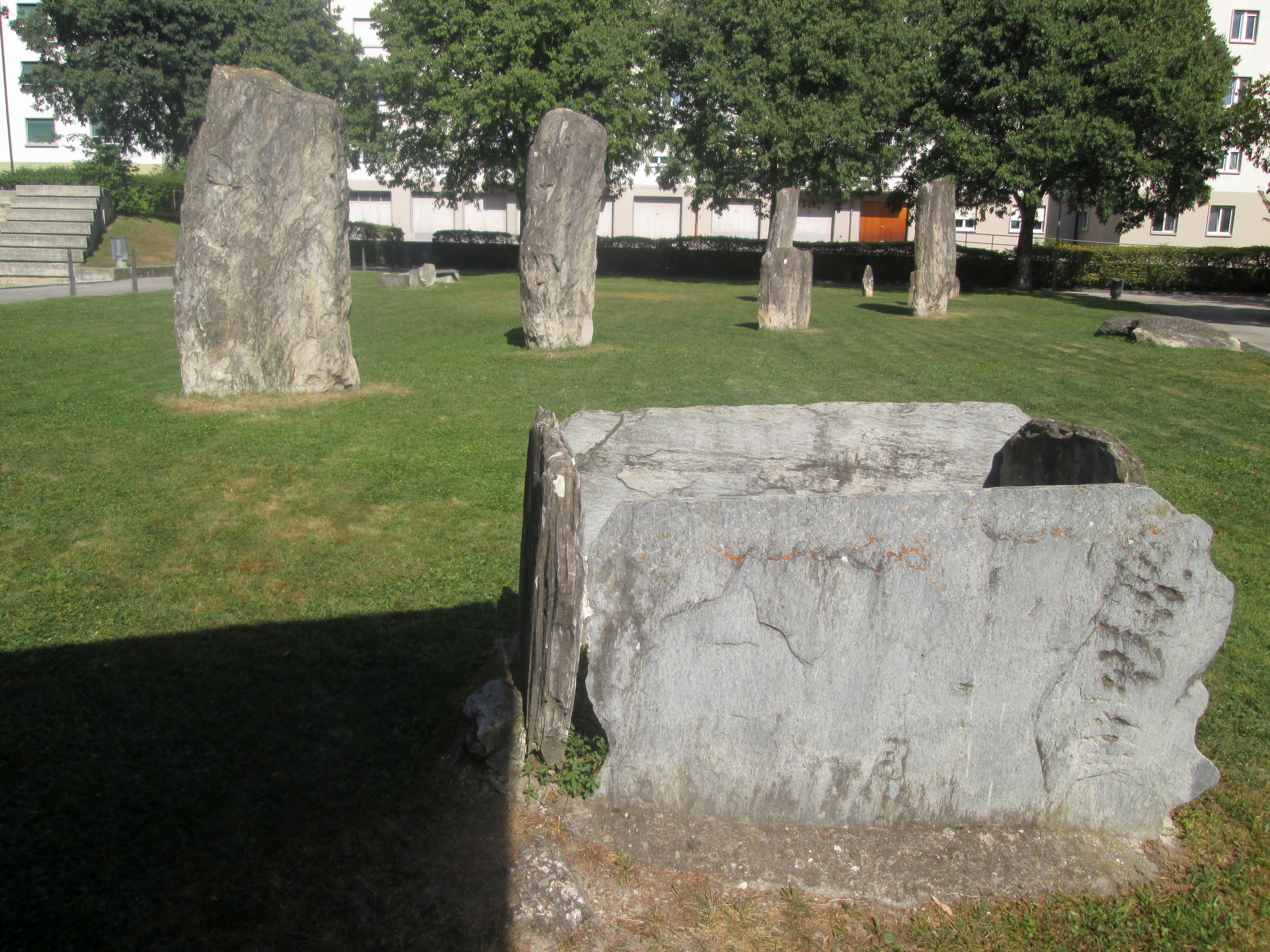

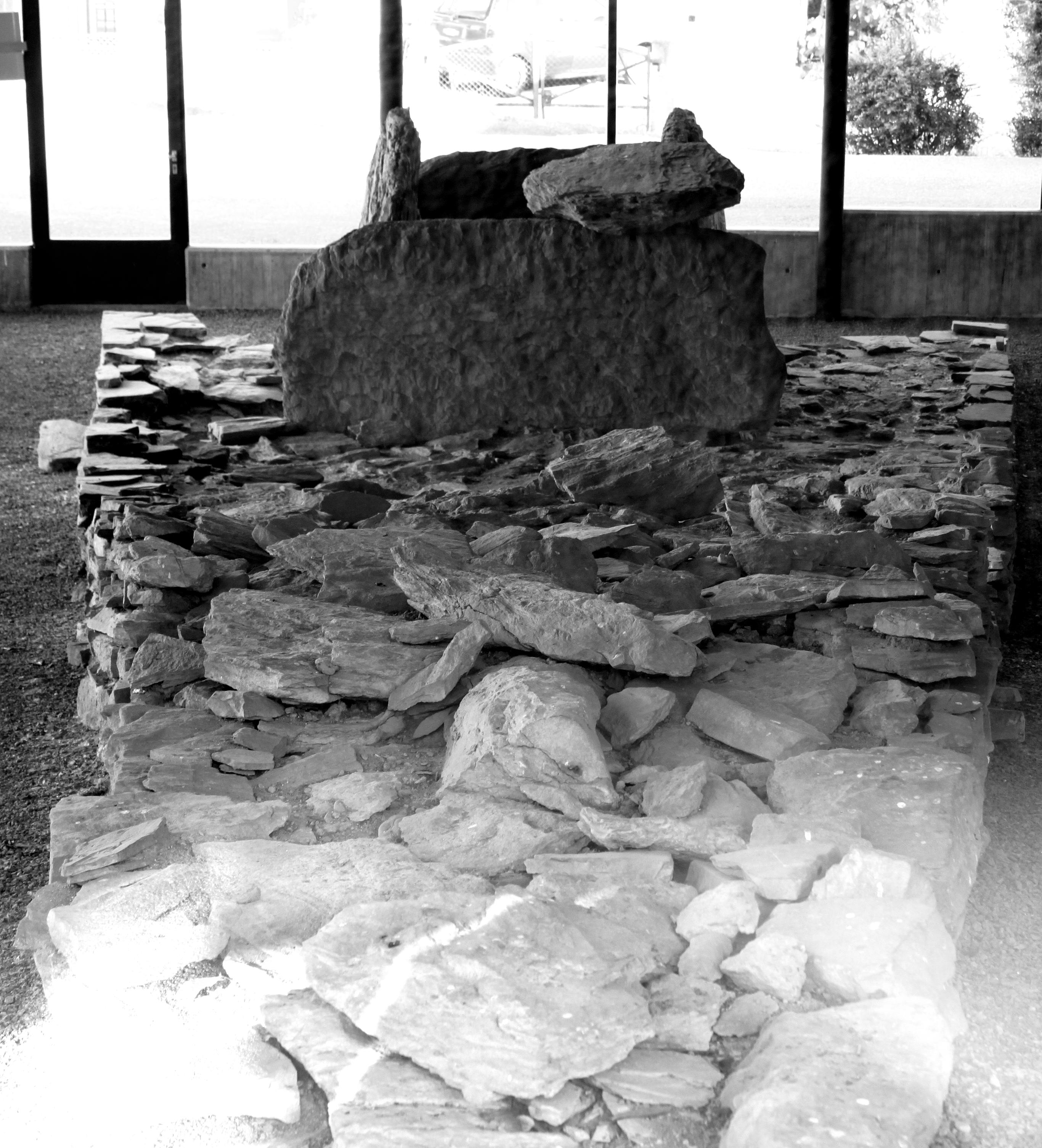

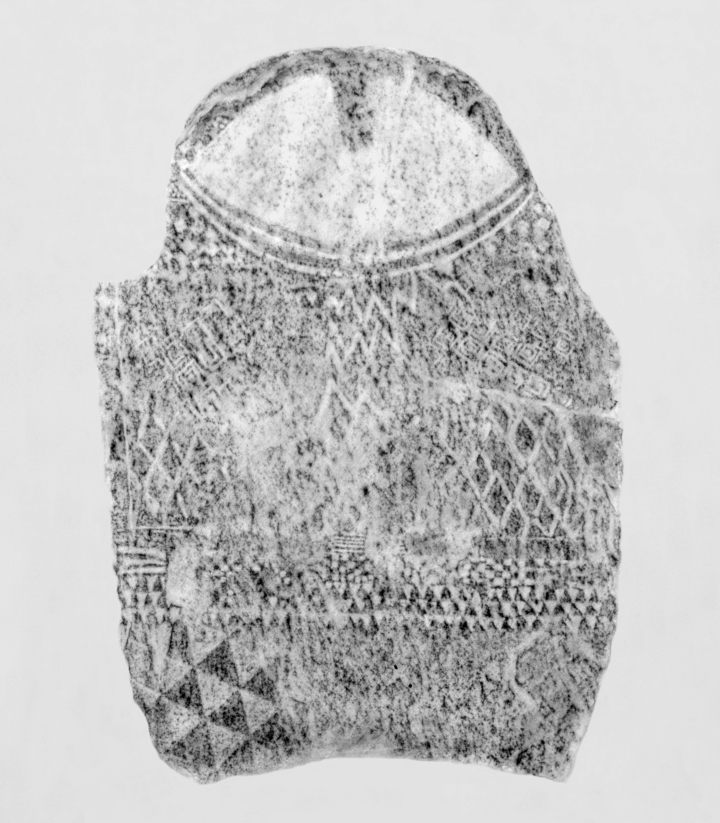

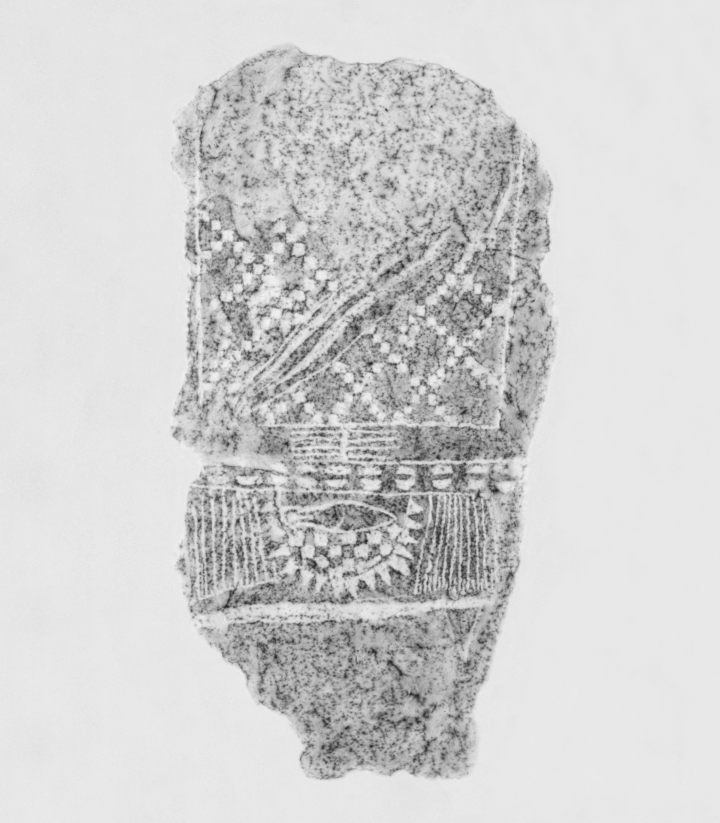

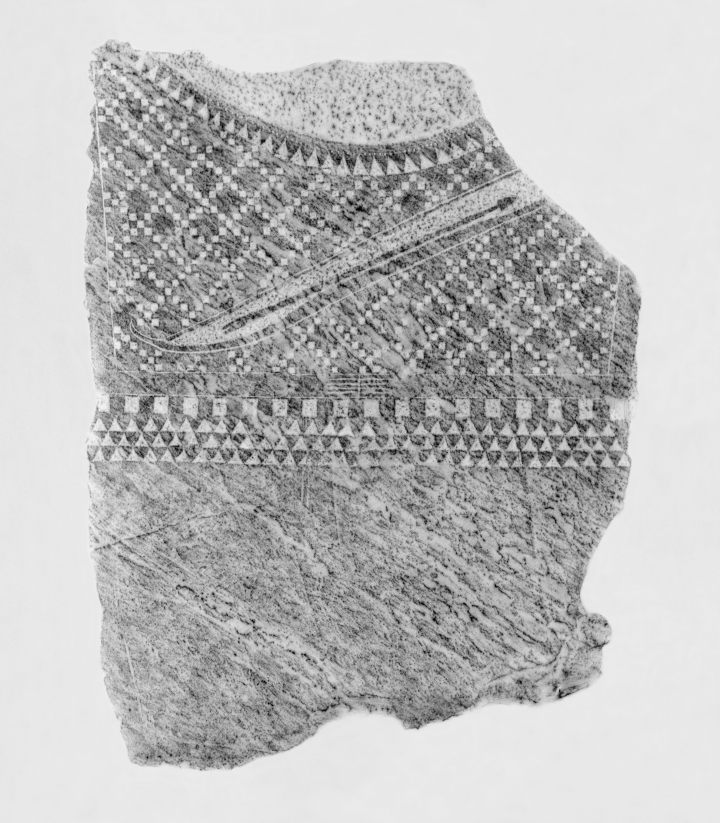

== See also ==
- Saint-Martin-de-Corléans Megalithic Area
