= Saint-Martin-de-Corléans Megalithic Area =

Megalithic site and museum in Aosta, Italy

Coordinates: 45.7354°N 7.2975°E

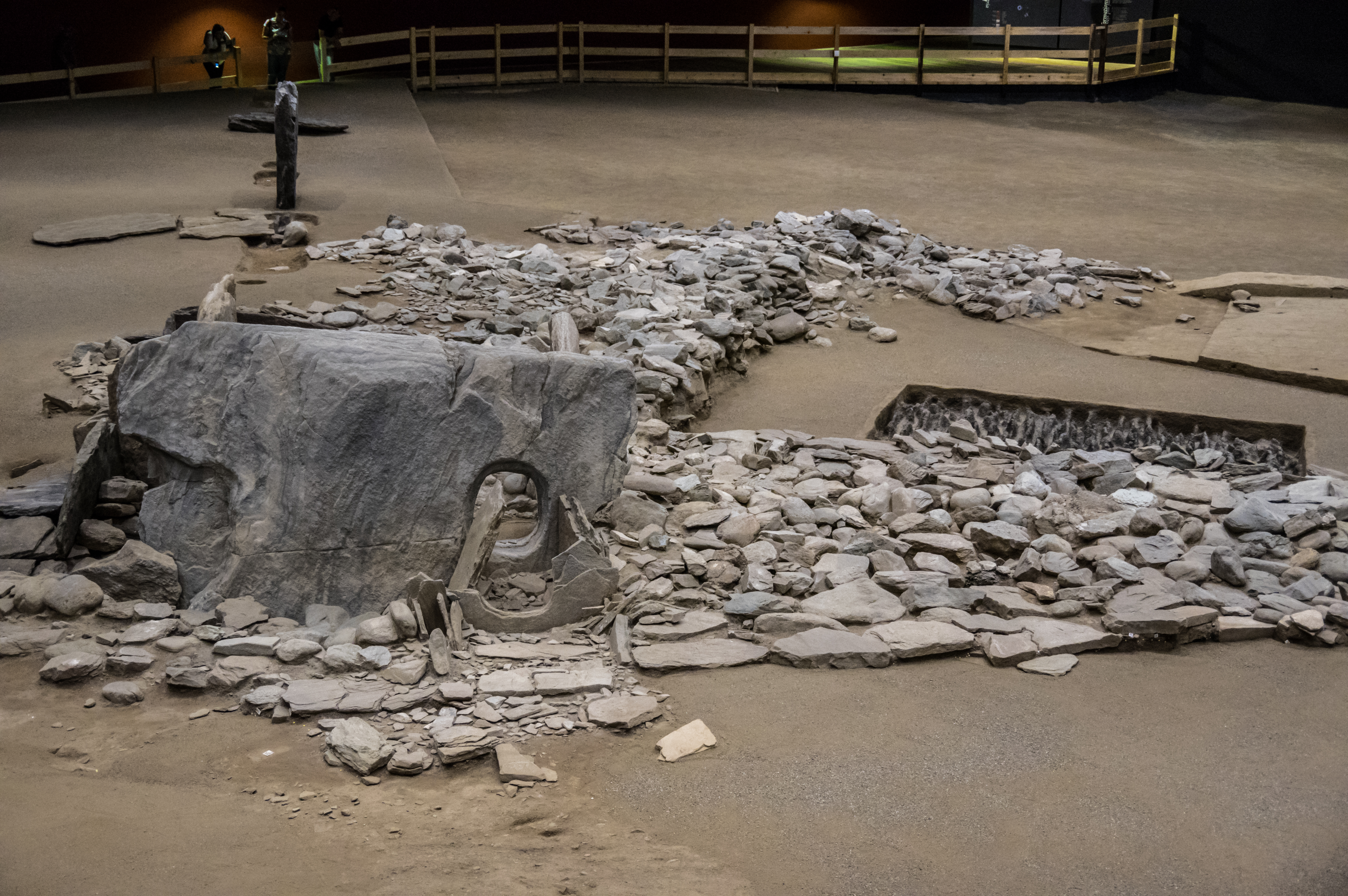
Saint-Martin-de-Corléans 27082016-027

The Saint-Martin-de-Corléans Megalithic Area (Italian: Area Megalitica di Saint-Martin-de-Corléans, French: Aire mégalithique de Saint-Martin-de-Corléans) is an archaeological site that is considered of major importance for the study and knowledge of European prehistory and protohistory, located in the Saint-Martin-de-Corléans district of Aosta, Italy.

== Description ==
The site contains megalith dolmen and cist tombs, oriented alignments of holes in wooden poles and anthropomorphic stele dating back to the Neolithic era through the Bronze Age.

The site was discovered in 1969 during the construction of condominiums. Given the historical significance of the site, the Aosta Valley Regional Government purchased it to ensure protection and proper archaeological excavation. In the early 2000s the Saint-Martin-de-Corléans Archaeological Museum and Park was built over the site.

== Gallery ==
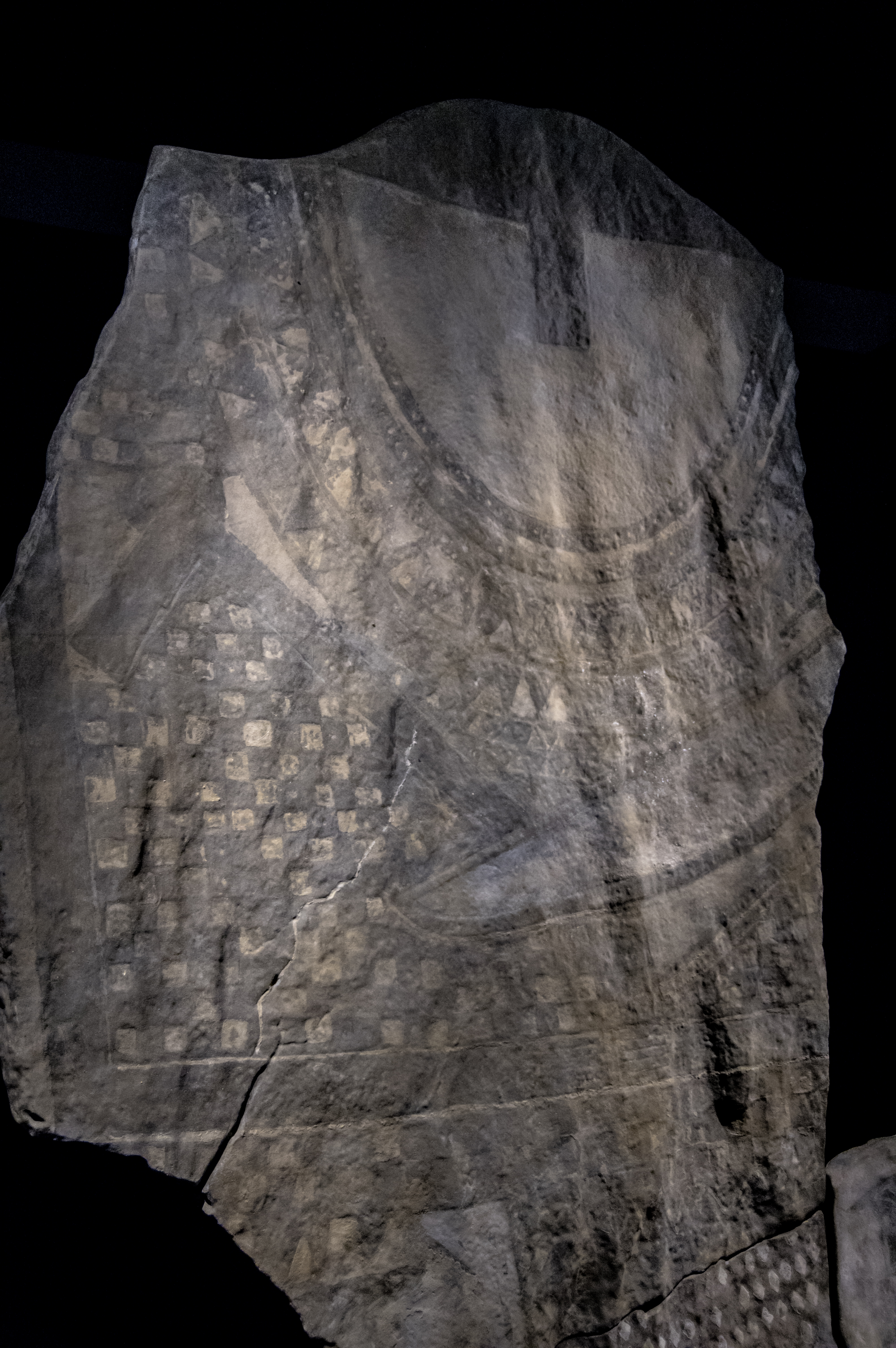

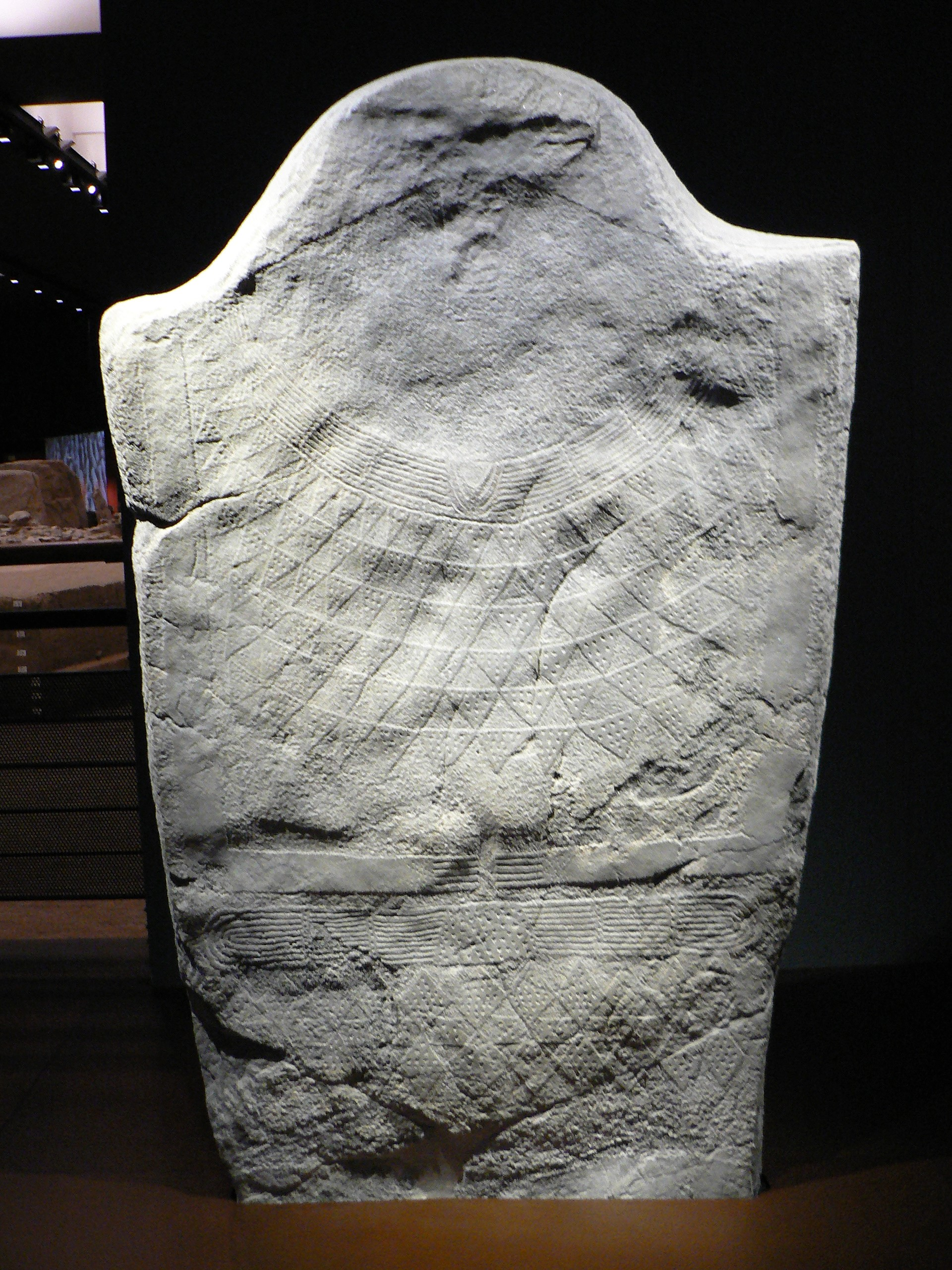

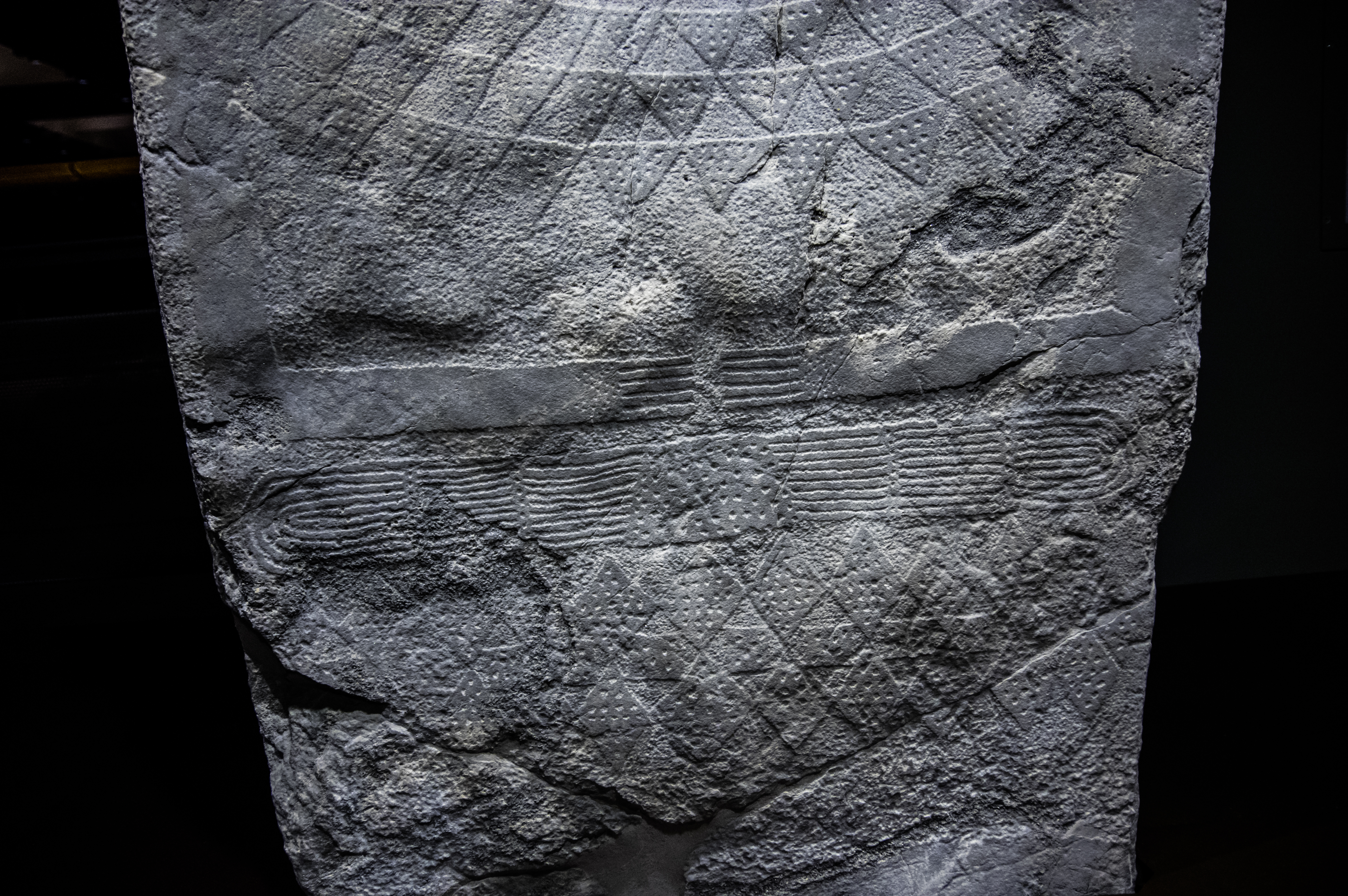

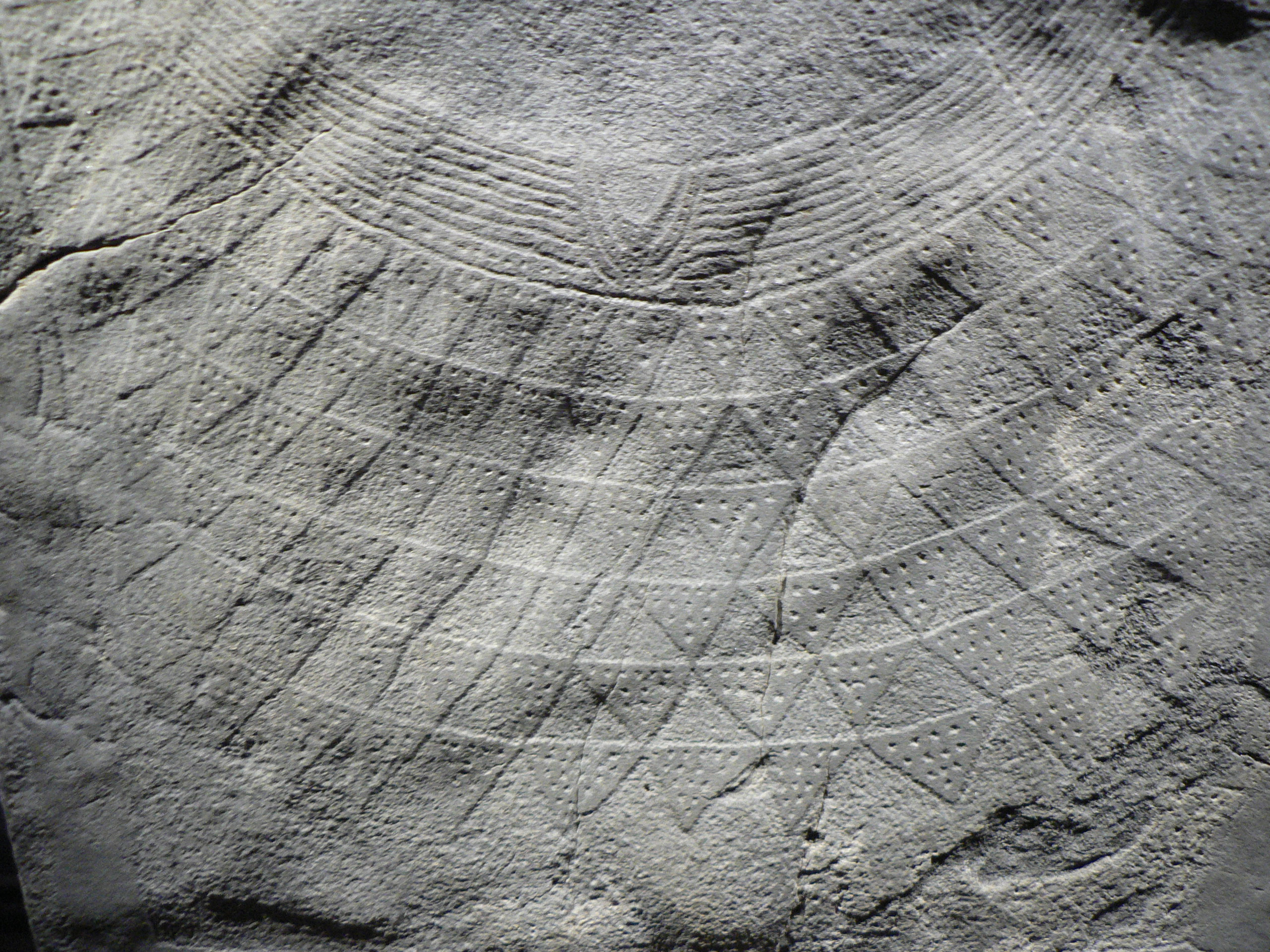

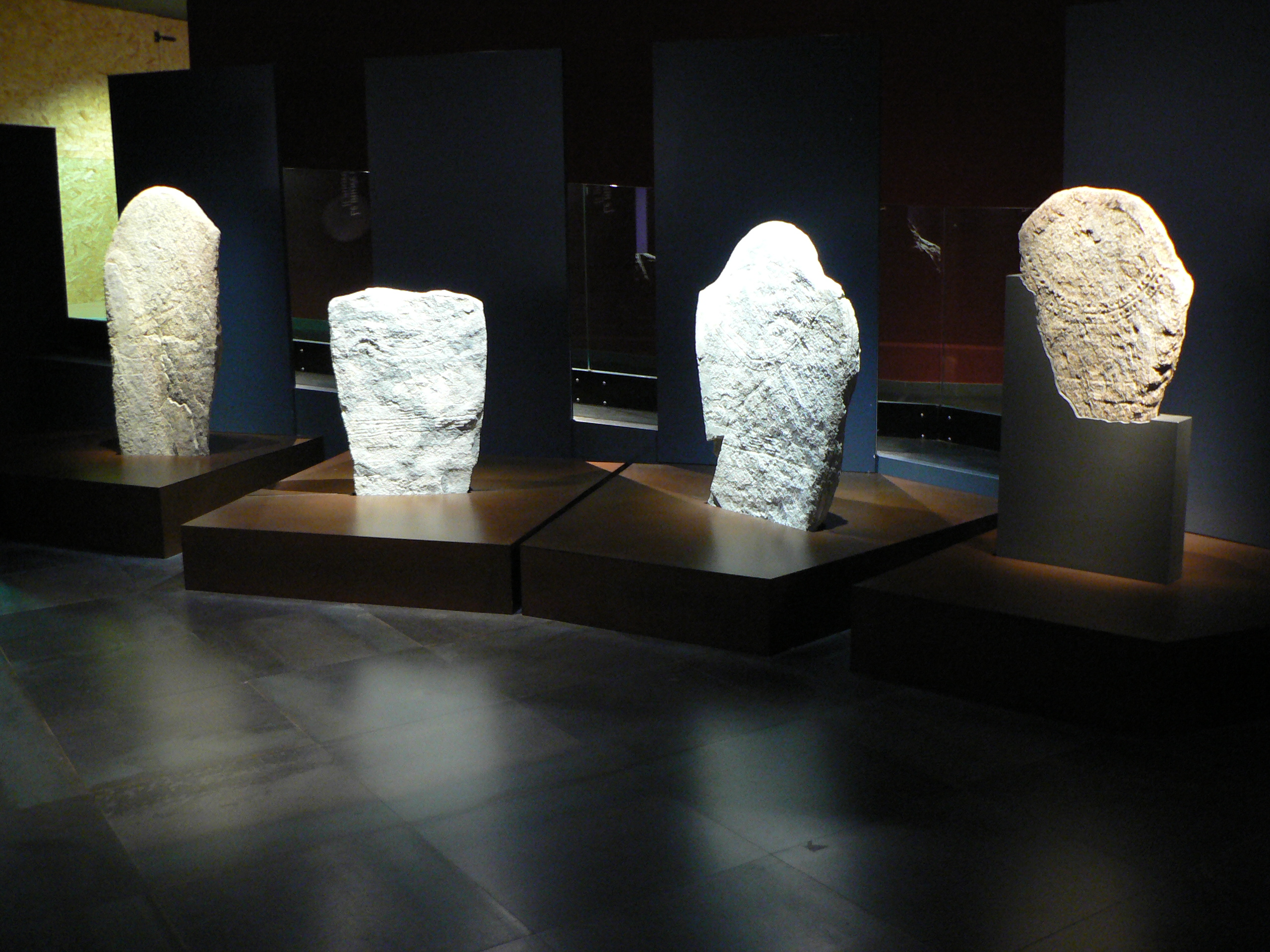

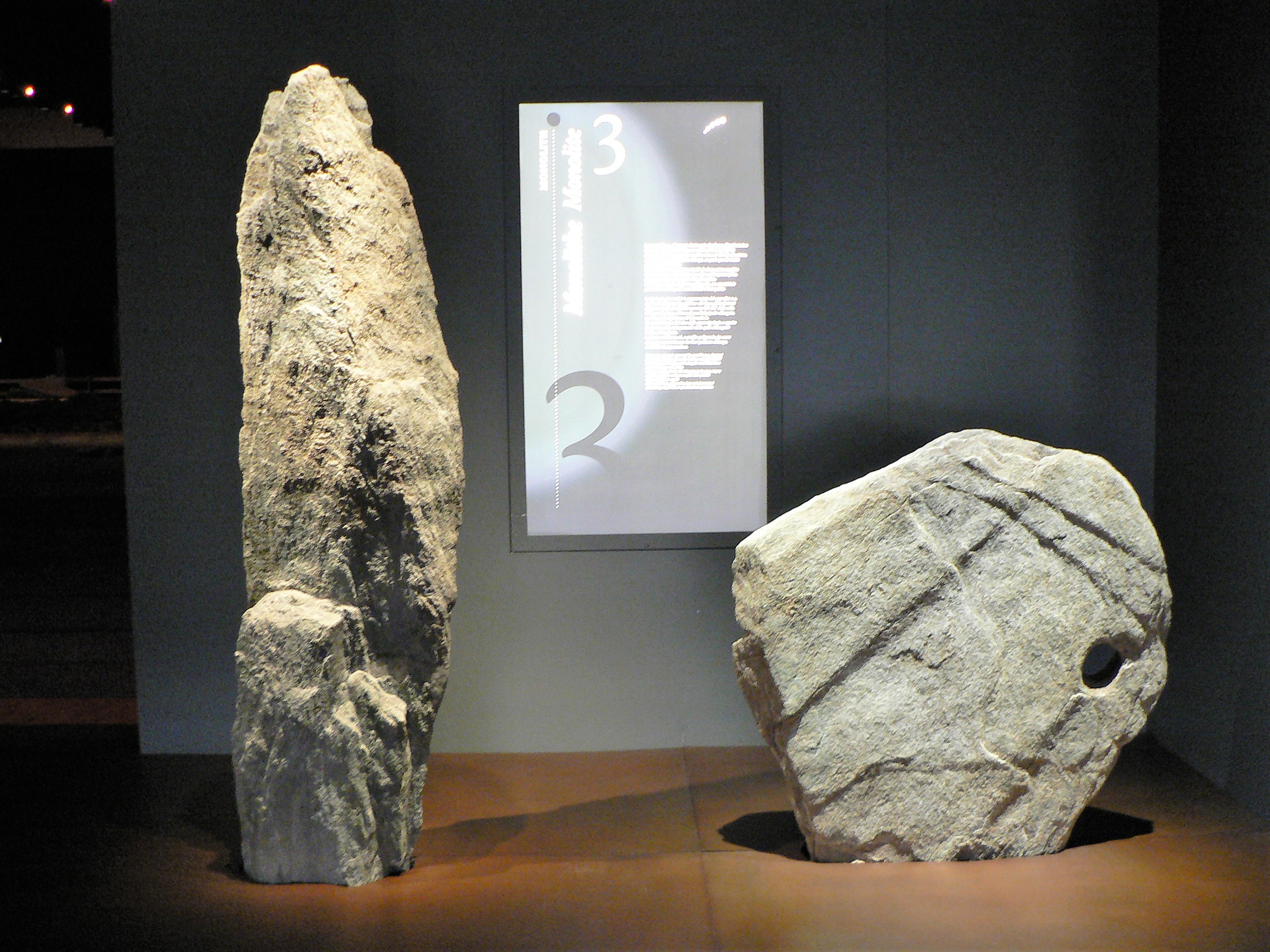

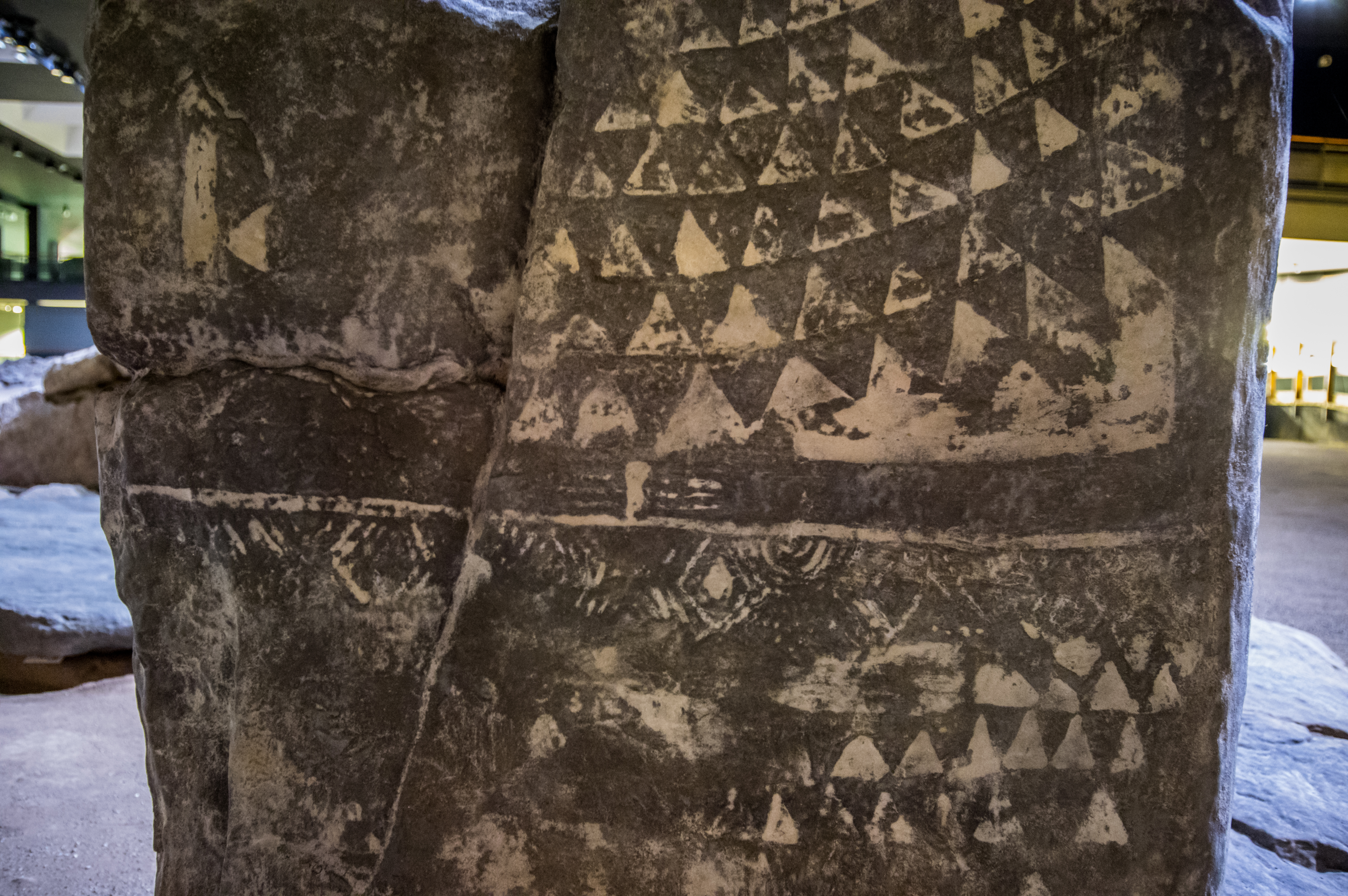

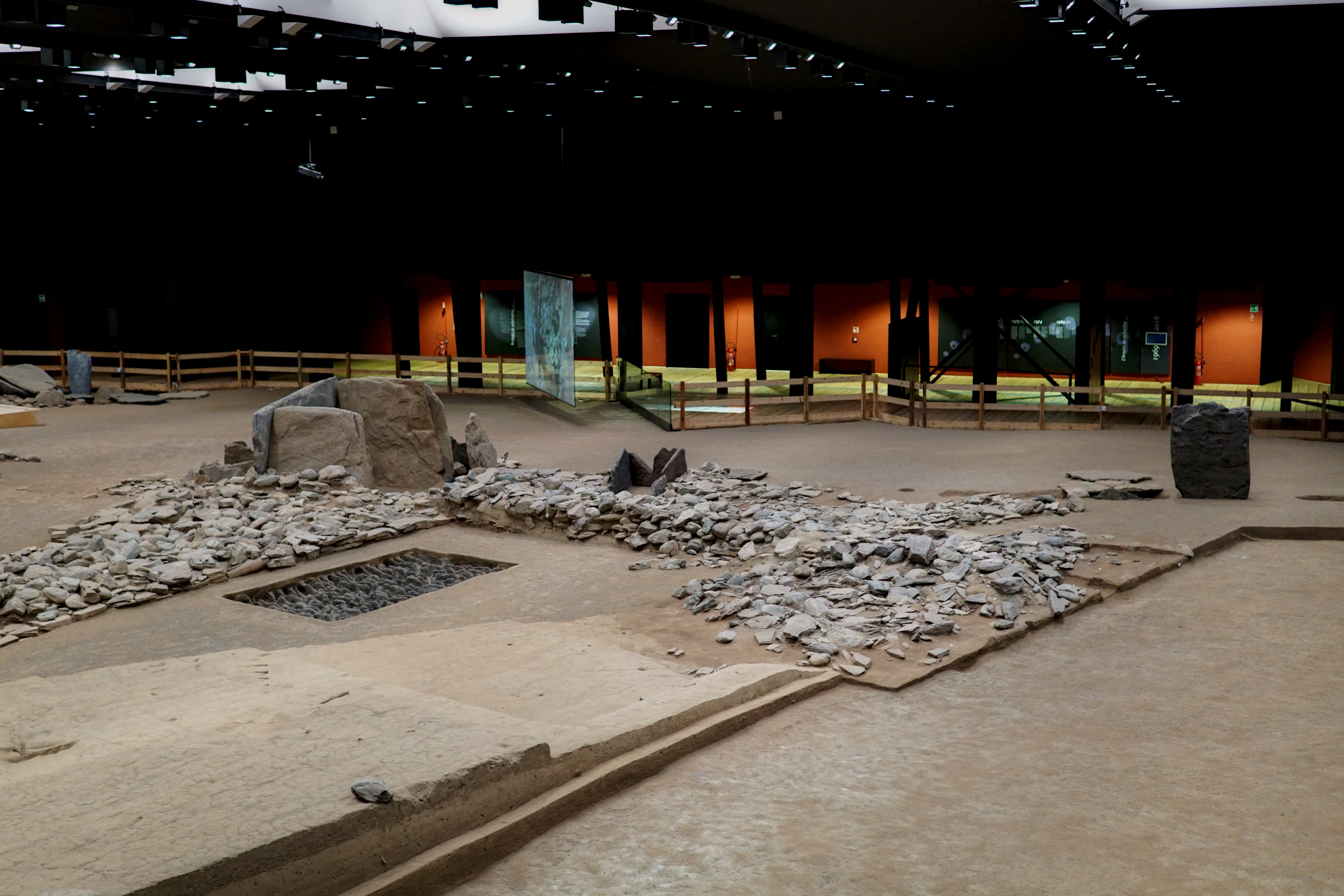

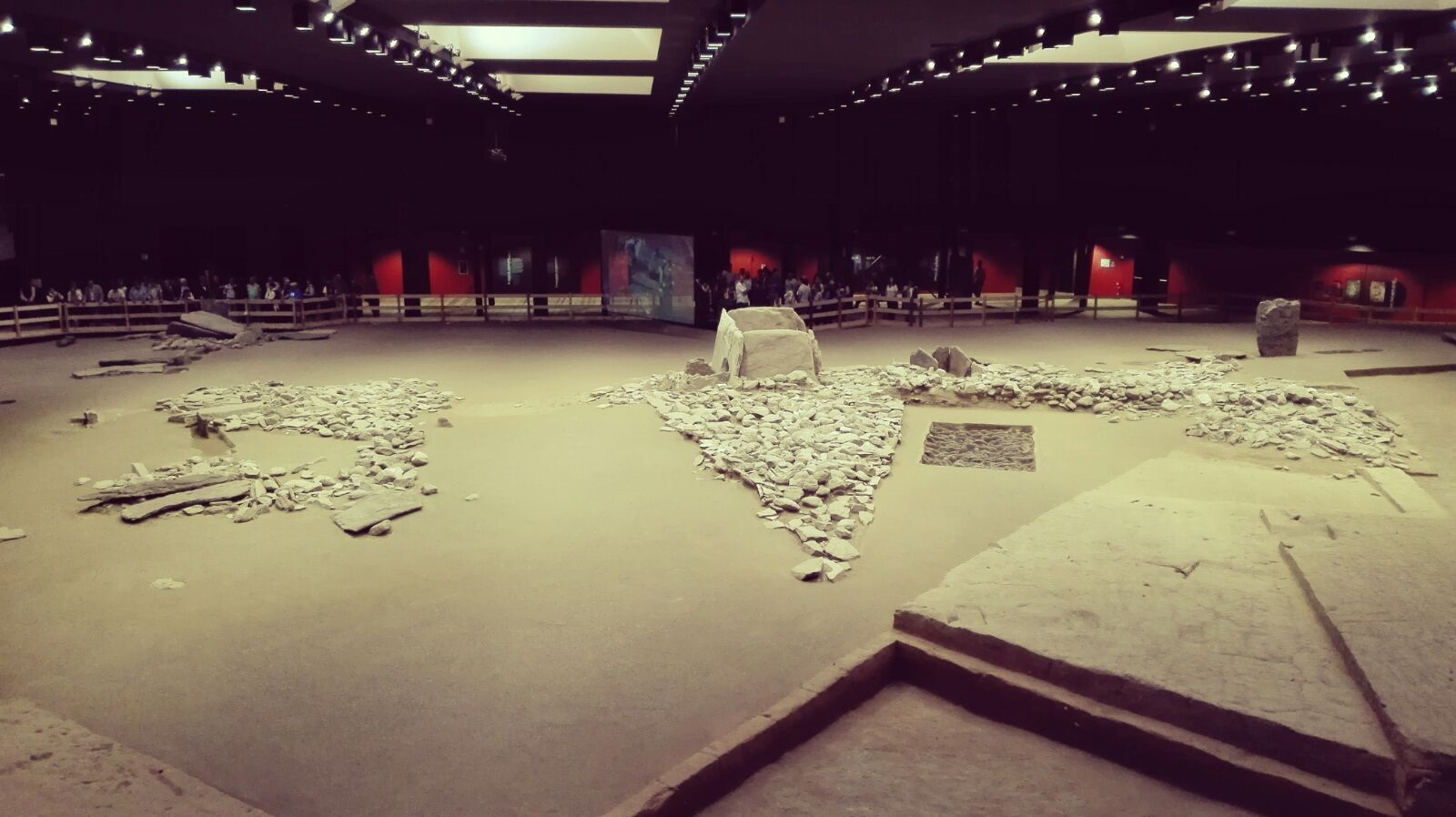

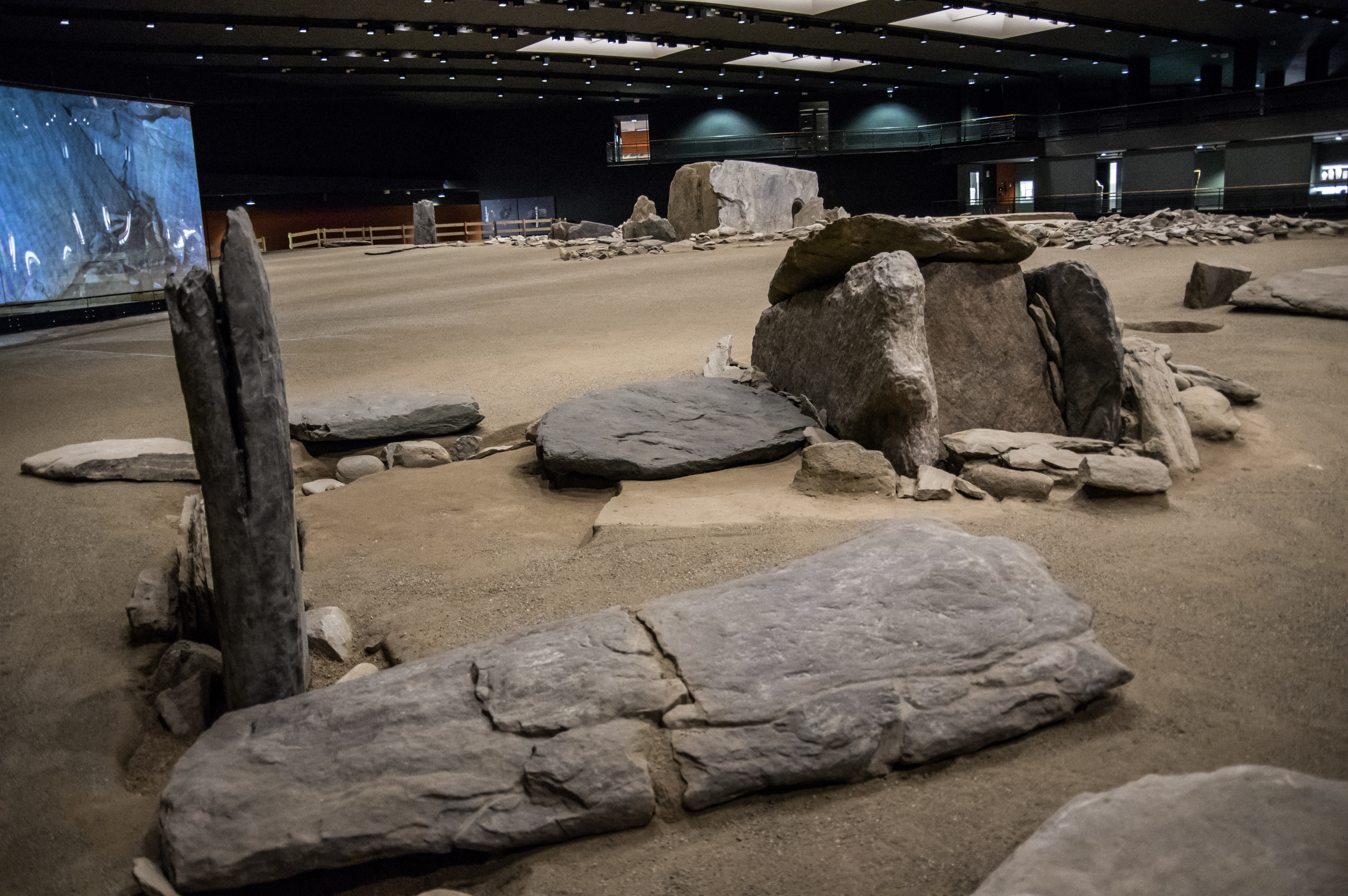

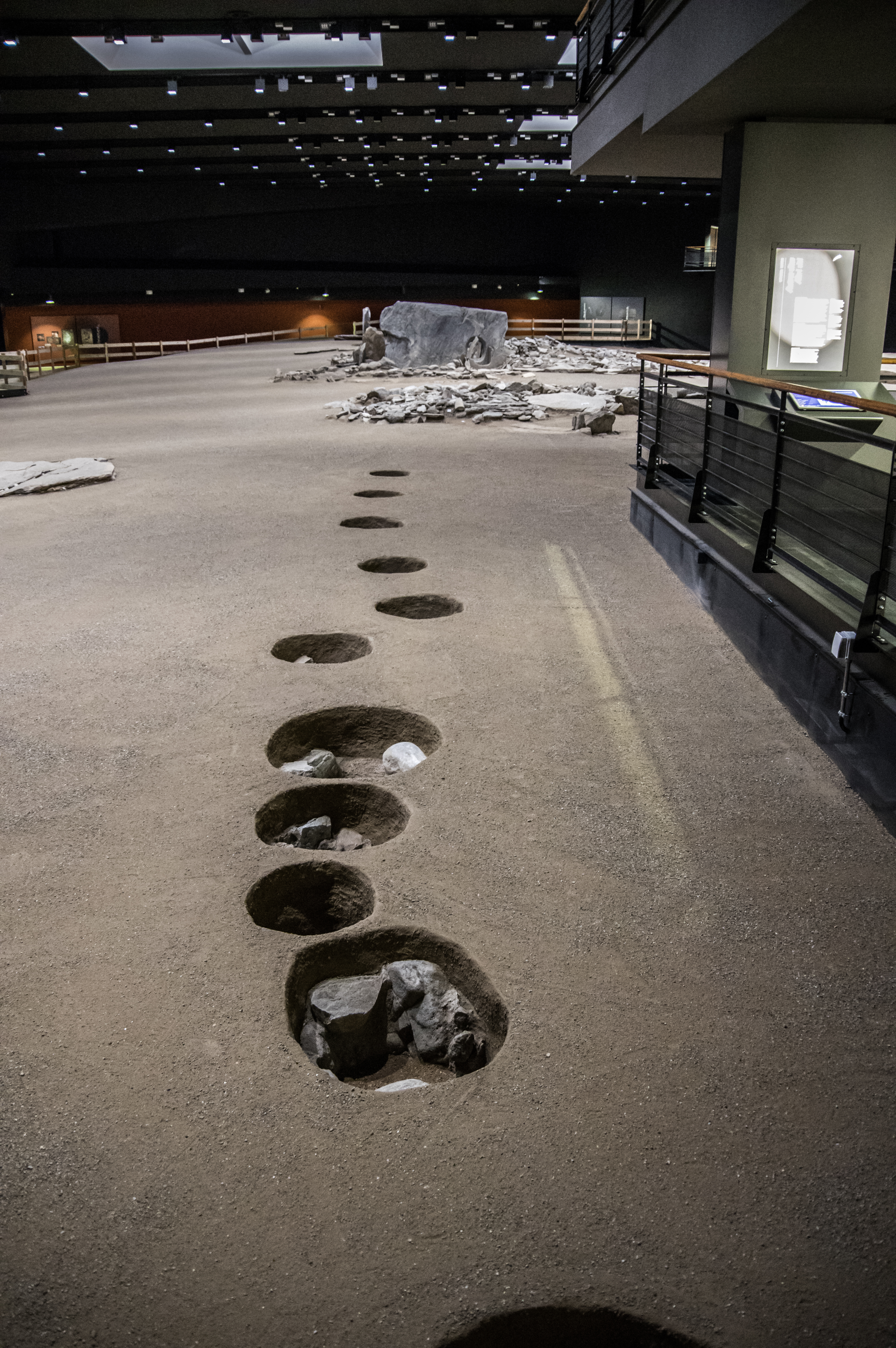

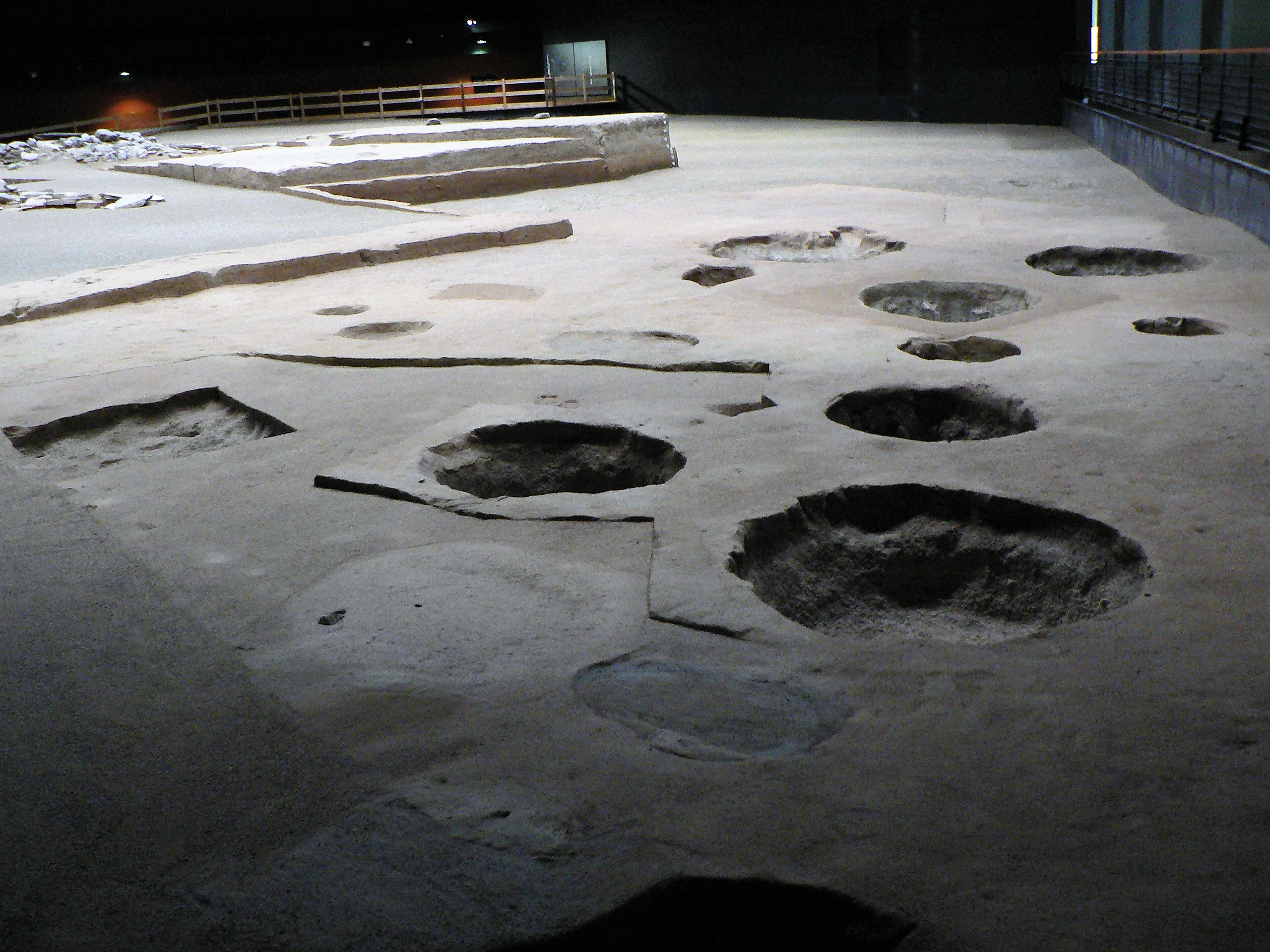

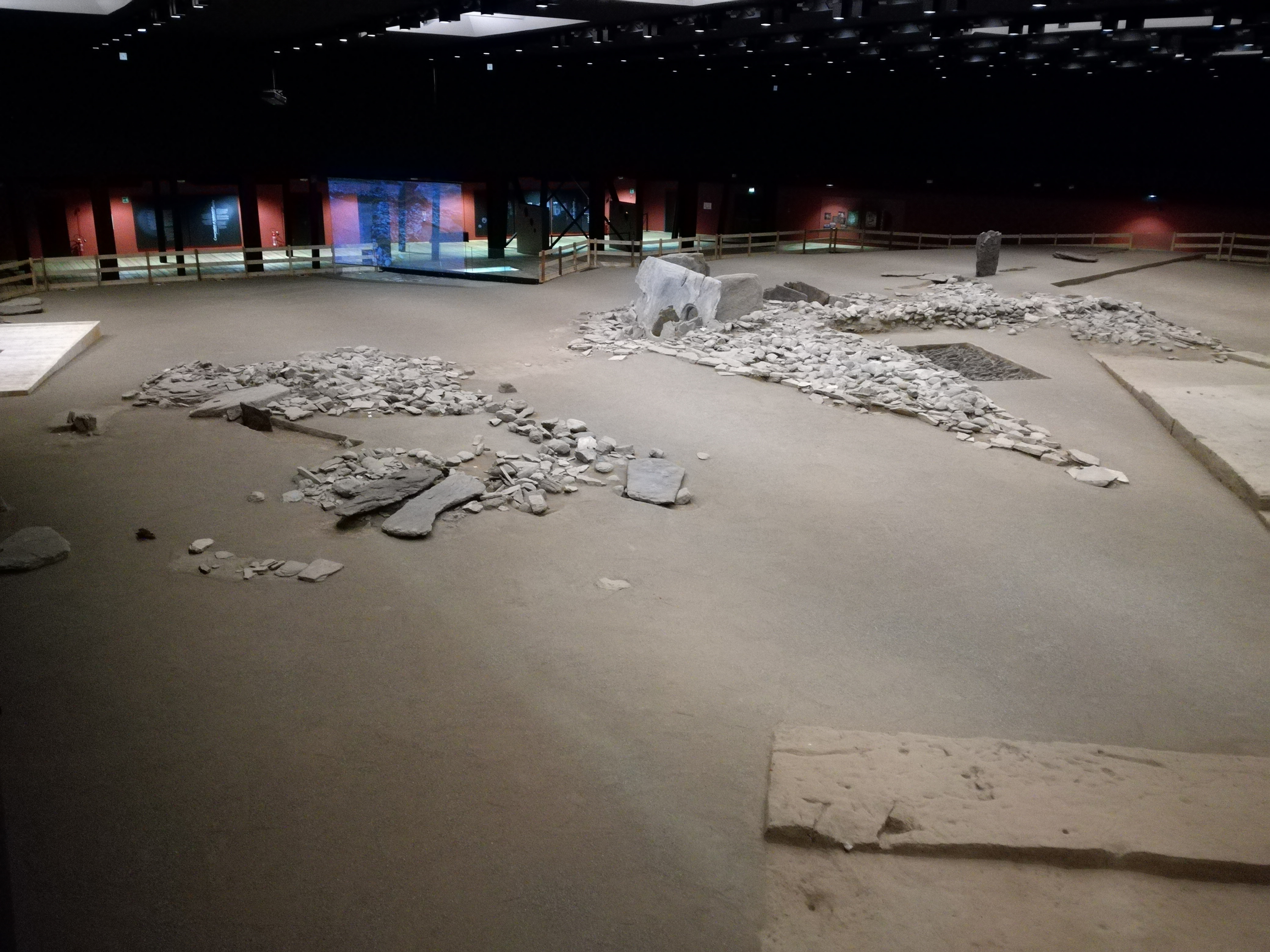

== See also ==
- Bell Beaker culture
- Le Petit-Chasseur
