= Puente de la Pólvora =

Coordinates: 37.9778°N 1.20386°W

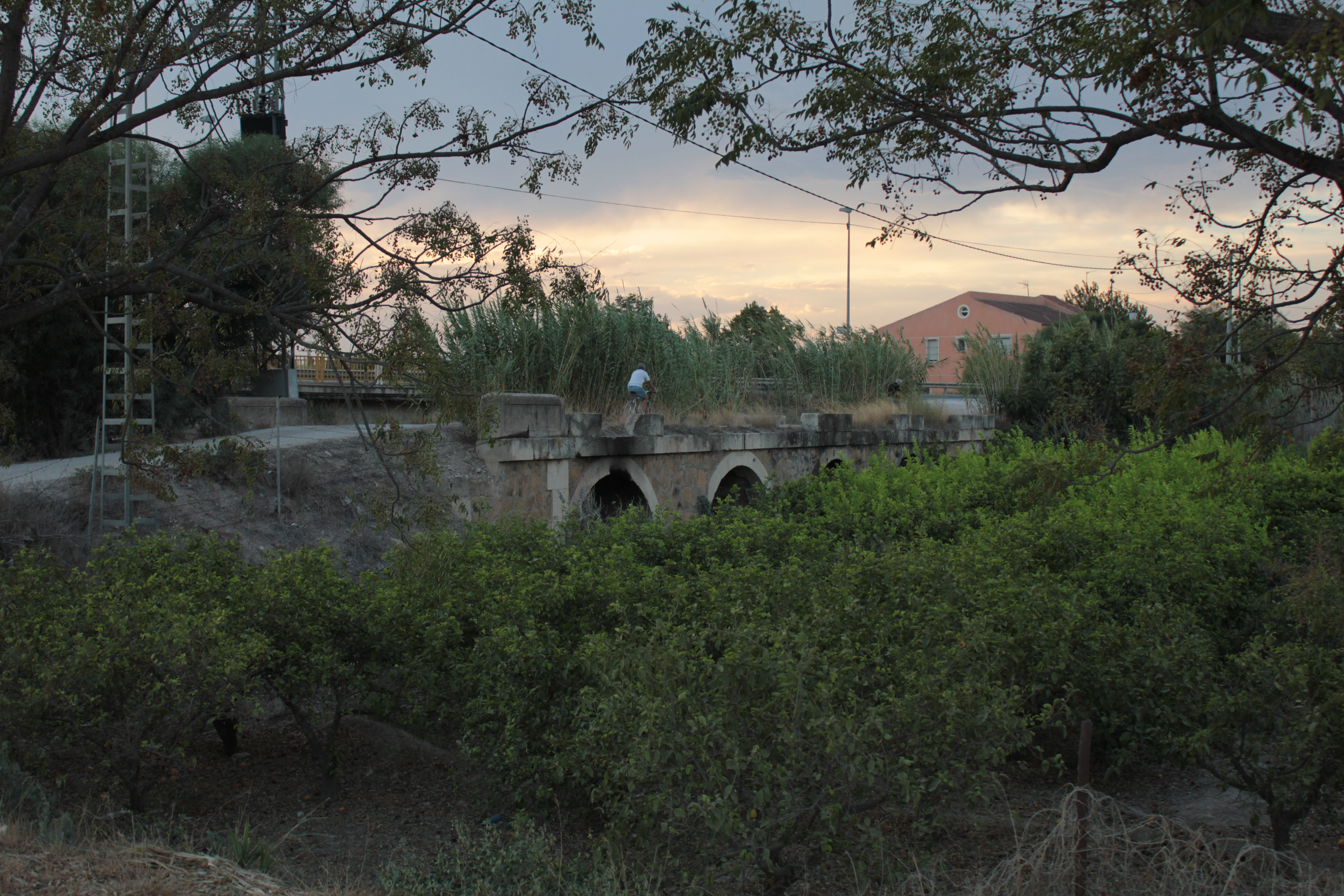
Remains of the "Puente de la Polvora" bridge in Murcia, Spain

El Puente de la Pólvora (Spanish for the Black-powder Bridge) was a metallic bridge with stone abutments spanning the Segura River. The structure was completed with five stone arches on the left side of the bridge designed to span the river flood plain. Built between 1870 and 1877 in the vicinity of Javalí Viejo and Alcantarilla, in the Región de Murcia (Spain), the bridge was designed by the civil engineers Manuel Pardo Sánchez-Salvador (for the stone structure) and José Caunedo Sánchez (for the metallic structure). Both structures were built by Pedro Díaz Sánchez y Francisco Peña y Baquero respectively.

The bridge was originally built to allow the transit of black powder convoys arriving from the neighbouring military factory and heading to the Port of Cartagena. Prior to the construction of the bridge, these dangerous convoys had to pass periodically through the city of Murcia in order to cross the river by the only existing bridge over the Segura in the vicinity: El Puente de los Peligros. Until the construction of the bridge, the inhabitants of Murcia complained repeatedly about the risk that those black powder transports meant for the city.

In 1975, the metallic structure was dismantled and sold as scrap due to the construction, in 1974, of a reinforced concrete bridge few meters upstream. Later on, the right abutment was demolished during the channelling of the river. The left abutment and the five stone arches still remain in place and are currently used to access the river channelling service road.

== Bibliography ==
- Gimeno Díaz de Atauri, Jorge; Gutiérrez Andrés, Juan (2001), El Puente de la Pólvora y otros puentes, Murcia: Colegio de Ingenieros de Caminos, Canales y Puentes. Demarcación Murcia, ISBN 978-84-607-3209-9
- Sánchez Baeza, Emilio (1976), Javalí-Viejo: Notas para su historia, Alicante: Gráficas Díaz, ISBN 84-400-1343-4
