= Puente Nuevo (Murcia) =

Coordinates: 37.9813°N 1.12682°W

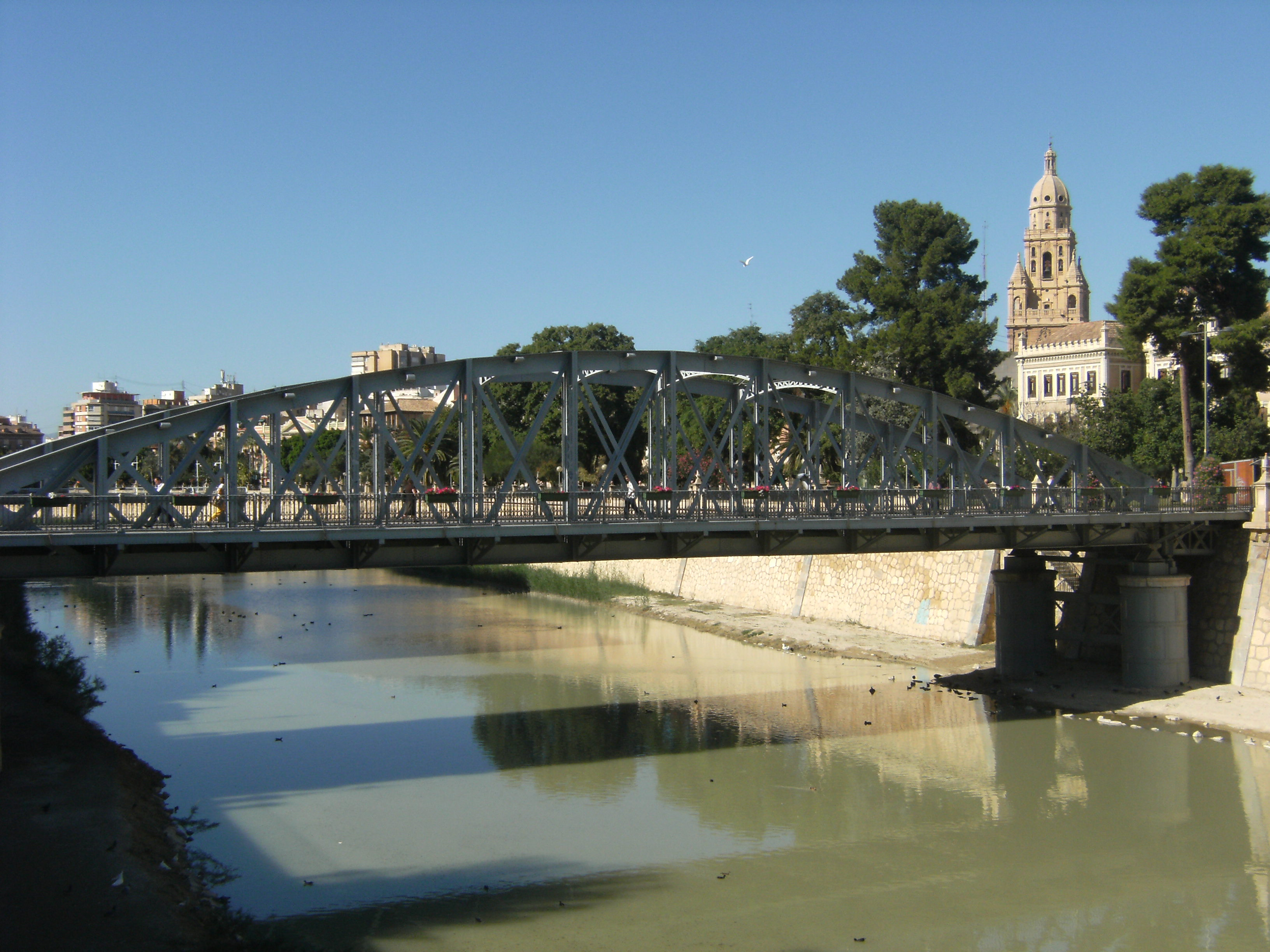
The New Bridge over the River Segura seen from downstream. In the background the tower of the Cathedral.

El Puento Nuevo (Spanish for New Bridge) or Puente de Hierro (Spanish for Iron Bridge) is a parabolic metallic bridge spanning the Segura River, completed in 1903 and located in the city of Murcia (Region of Murcia, Spain). As the second bridge built in the city across the river, was called New Bridge to distinguish it from the old bridge (Puente Viejo o Puente de los Peligros), even though today it is the second oldest of the city.

== Construction ==
It was designed in 1894 by the civil engineer José María Ortiz and was built by the company Materiales para Ferrocarriles y Construcciones of Barcelona with a budget of 592,982.95 pesetas finishing work on 21 February 1903.

The bridge had a central span (46.80 meter long) with external platforms and an upper parabolic chord supported by tubular cells, and eight additional spans of 11.25 m each supported on metallic girders. These height access spans were demolished with the channelling of the river in the 60s, remaining in place only the central parabolic span.

== Traffic closure and restoration ==
In March 2001, the bridge was closed to traffic for structural reasons. Murcia City Council decided its restoration trying to preserve as much as possible the original structure. This led to its transformation into a pedestrian-only bridge because the original bridge was not designed for the traffic loads required by the current Spanish bridge standards (IAP-98).

The restoration project was conducted in June 2001 by Javier Manterola. After a series of preliminary studies which confirmed the validity of the proposed restoration, works began on 26 July 2002. The bridge reopened to the public on 13 May 2003.

== Bibliography ==
- Gimeno Díaz de Atauri, Jorge; Gutiérrez Andrés, Juan (2001), El Puente de la Pólvora y otros puentes, Murcia: Colegio de Ingenieros de Caminos, Canales y Puentes. Demarcación Murcia, ISBN 978-84-607-3209-9
- Manterola Armisén, Javier; Fernández Revenga, Javier; Muñoz-Rojas Fernández, Javier (2004), Memorias de patrimonio 1998–2002. Intervenciones en el patrimonio histórico de la Región De Murcia. Inmuebles. Nº 6 (PDF), Murcia: Consejería de Educación y Cultura. Dirección General de Cultura. Servicio de Patrimonio Histórico, D.L.: MU-1.732-2004
