= Alcantarilla =

- Municipality
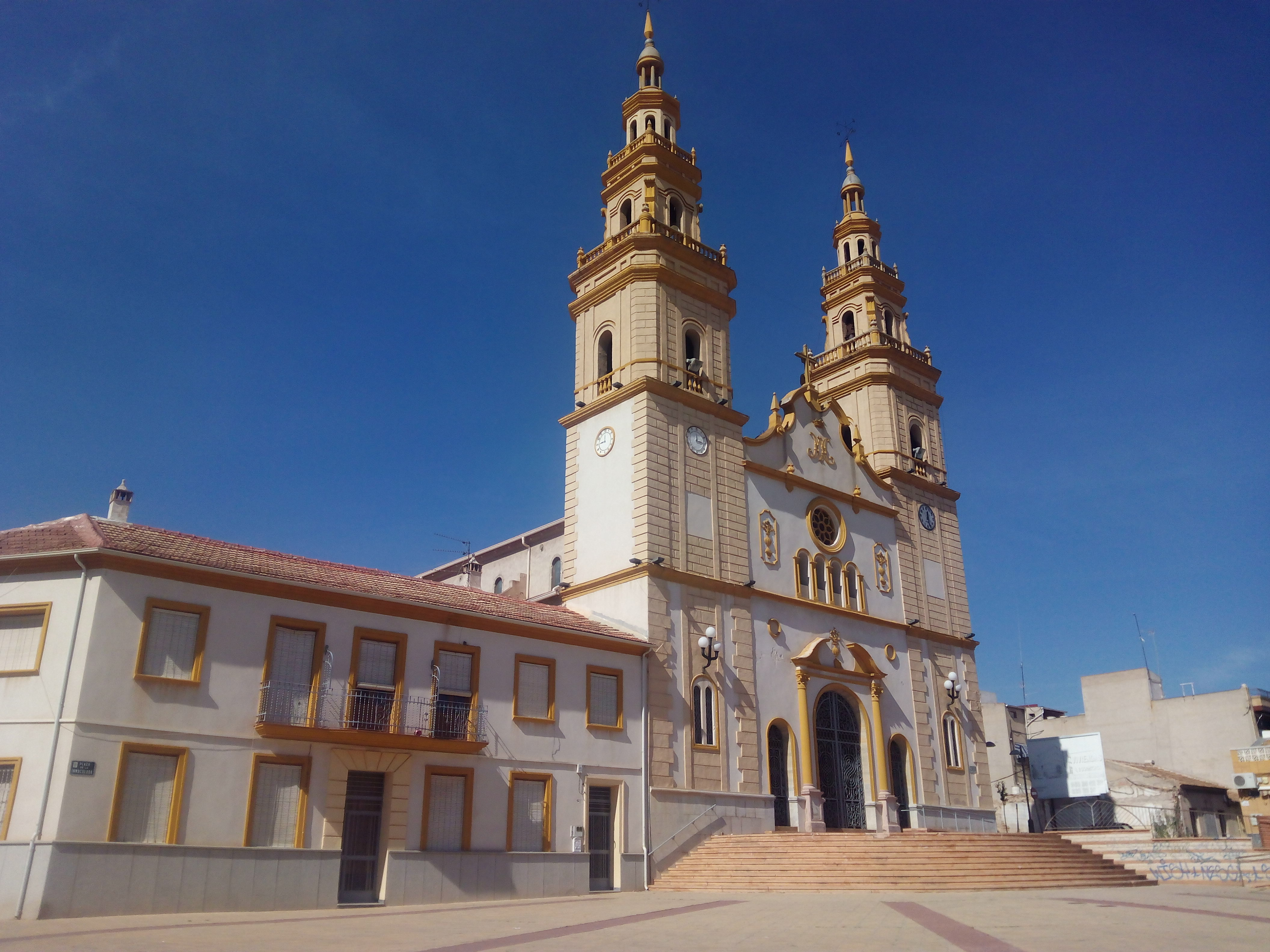

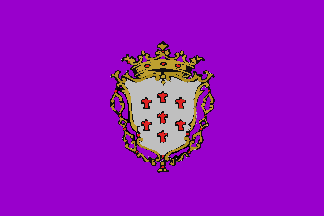
- Flag Coat of arms

- Location in Murcia

- Location in Murcia Location in Spain
- Country: Spain
- Autonomous Community: Region of Murcia
- Province: Murcia
- Comarca: Huerta de Murcia

Government
  - Mayor: Joaquín Ricardo Buendía Gómez (PP)

Area
  - Total: 16 km^{2} (6.2 sq mi)
- Elevation (AMSL): 62 m (203 ft)

Population (2025-01-01)
  - Total: 43,876
  - Density: 2,700/km^{2} (7,100/sq mi)
- Time zone: UTC+1 (CET)
  - Summer (DST): UTC+2 (CEST (GMT +2))
- Postal code: 30820
- Area code: +34 (Spain) + 968 (Murcia)
- Website: www.alcantarilla.es

Alcantarilla (Spanish: [alkantaˈɾiʎa]) is a town and municipality in southeastern Spain, in the Autonomous Community of the Region of Murcia. The town is only 7 km away from the capital of the region, the city of Murcia, and one of its peculiarities is that it is completely surrounded by "pedanías" (satellite districts or boroughs) of the municipality of Murcia like Sangonera La Seca, San Ginés, Nonduermas, Puebla de Soto, La Ñora, Javalí Viejo and Javalí Nuevo.

The town is part of a low-lying fertile plain rich in gardens, orchards and citrus fruits, known as the "Huerta", which includes the valleys of the river Segura and its right-hand tributary the Guadalentín or river Sangonera and is surrounded by mountains. The Huerta belongs mainly to the large administrative authority of the city of Murcia but it also includes other small municipalities (Alcantarilla, Beniel y Santomera) that could not be omitted from the Huerta's framework either functionally or visually.

The Paratrooper Military School (Escuela Militar de Paracaidismo) "Méndez Parada" of the Spanish Air and Space Force is quartered at the Alcantarilla Air Base, which is also used by the Paratrooper Brigade of the Spanish Army, an airborne elite unit called the Black Berets, which has a base in Murcia, not far from the air base at Alcantarilla.

== History ==
Human presence in Alcantarilla dates from prehistoric times. Iberian and Roman settlement remains have been found, including a beautiful vase of Greek origin that can be seen in Murcia's Archeological Museum. Since a road linking the former Carthago Nova, (today's Cartagena) with inland Hispanic towns crossed the town in Roman times, Roman presence seems to have been constant in the town for some centuries.

The first reference to the town in historical records is from the twelfth century, when the Muslim geographer Al-Idrisi writes about the town of Qantara Asqaba (قنطرة اشكابة), between Murcia and the nearby Librilla, on the way to the province of Almería. "The nearest bridge" (translation of Qantara Asqaba) must have been the one that over the river Segura, some 400 metres up the river from the present bridge that links La Ñora and Puebla de Soto with Alcantarilla.

Alcantarilla soon became part of Al-Andalus. In the 8th century, nearly all the Iberian peninsula, which had been under Visigothic rule, was quickly conquered (711–718), by Muslims (the Moors), who had crossed over from North Africa, defeating the Visigoths. Visigothic Spain was the last of a series of Christian and pagan lands conquered in a great westward charge from the Middle East and across north Africa by the religiously inspired armies of the Umayyad empire.

During the centuries that the Muslim domination of southern and central Spain lasted, Alcantarilla was part of the Kingdom of Murcia, the latter coming into independent existence as a taifa centered on the Moorish city of Murcia after the fall of the Umayyad Caliphate of Córdoba (11th century). After the Battle of az-Zallaqah (also known as Battle of Sagrajas) in 1086 the Almoravid dynasty swallowed up the taifas and reunited Islamic Spain. With the Reconquista (Reconquest), the town came to be known as "Alcantariella" or "the small bridge".

Ferdinand III of Castile received the submission of the Moorish king of Murcia in 1243. In 1252 the King Alfonso X gave the town to the Order of Alcántara, when Murcia was still only a Castilian protectorate. In 1266, when Murcia finally was under full Christian control, the town remained a part of the territories that were left to the Muslim King of La Arrixaca Muhammad ibn-Hud, but four years later it became a property of Queed Doña Violante. The battles that took place in relation to the succession of King Alfonso X of Castile affected the town and the king handed the town in to the town of Murcia in 1283 on condition that Alcantarilla be inhabited by a Christian population. This would have amounted to the incorporation of the town as a district of the town of Murcia and a different historical development of the town but the death of Alfonso X the following year and the crowning of King Sancho IV did not make the incorporation possible. Alcantarilla would continue to be an independent town with a Muslim population until the 16th century and maintained its independence up until the present day. The town would again be transferred to Queen Doña Violante until 1296, when Murcia and its region (including Alcantarilla) were transferred to the Crown of Aragon. The town was then given by the King of Aragon to the nobleman Joan Garcés de Loasia and remained an Aragonese possession until 1300, when Queen Doña Violante took possession of the town again. After the Queen's death, the town came to belong to Ms. María de Molina until her death in 1321. Alcantarilla's status would stabilise that year when the town council and bishop of Cartagena took over.

One of the historical episodes of the town that have made a strong popular impression on the present population is the existence of the Inquisition in the town in the 18th and 19th centuries, based in today's Casa de Cayitas. This seems to be the reason why citizens from Alcantarilla and nearby towns still consider Alcantarilla as "the town of witches", although it is clear that the kind of medieval witch burnings associated with the Inquisition in popular culture never took place in the town.

During the second half of the nineteenth century, many geographic, economical and structural issues made possible a large redevelopment of Alcantarilla. Thus, the once small village saw its biggest growth ever. Indeed, the Main Street and Alcantarilla's centre were completely transformed into a new space. These changes, beginning in the 16th century, were obvious when an important bourgeois class settled down along the Main Street attracted by its strong industry and excellent communications.

== Climate ==
Situated in the meridian border of the Temperate Zone, it enjoys a pleasant Mediterranean climate, as its proximity to the sea acts as a thermal cushion. The average annual temperatures stay around 18 °C. The winters are mild with an average in January of 10.2 °C and the summers are very hot with an August average of 27.2 °C.

Rain is scarce (usually less than 200 mm) and irregular, as are cloudy days, as there are more than 2,800 hours of sun annually.

Climate data for Alcantarilla Base Area 75m
Month	Jan	Feb	Mar	Apr	May	Jun	Jul	Aug	Sep	Oct	Nov	Dec	Year
Record high °C (°F)	28.2 (82.8)	29.0 (84.2)	33.0 (91.4)	36.6 (97.9)	39.0 (102.2)	44.0 (111.2)	46.1 (115.0)	47.0 (116.6)	40.2 (104.4)	36.0 (96.8)	31.0 (87.8)	27.0 (80.6)	47.0 (116.6)
Mean daily maximum °C (°F)	16.6 (61.9)	18.1 (64.6)	20.9 (69.6)	23.1 (73.6)	26.4 (79.5)	30.9 (87.6)	34.0 (93.2)	34.0 (93.2)	30.4 (86.7)	25.6 (78.1)	20.2 (68.4)	17.0 (62.6)	24.8 (76.6)
Daily mean °C (°F)	10.2 (50.4)	11.7 (53.1)	14.1 (57.4)	16.1 (61.0)	19.6 (67.3)	23.9 (75.0)	26.9 (80.4)	27.2 (81.0)	24.0 (75.2)	19.4 (66.9)	14.3 (57.7)	11.1 (52.0)	18.2 (64.8)
Mean daily minimum °C (°F)	3.9 (39.0)	5.2 (41.4)	7.2 (45.0)	9.2 (48.6)	12.7 (54.9)	16.9 (62.4)	19.7 (67.5)	20.4 (68.7)	17.4 (63.3)	13.2 (55.8)	8.4 (47.1)	5.1 (41.2)	11.6 (52.9)
Record low °C (°F)	−5 (23)	−5 (23)	−4.2 (24.4)	−0.2 (31.6)	3.6 (38.5)	9.0 (48.2)	12.2 (54.0)	8.6 (47.5)	7.4 (45.3)	1.0 (33.8)	−2.6 (27.3)	−6 (21)	−6 (21)
Average precipitation mm (inches)	26 (1.0)	28 (1.1)	31 (1.2)	25 (1.0)	28 (1.1)	18 (0.7)	2 (0.1)	10 (0.4)	29 (1.1)	34 (1.3)	33 (1.3)	25 (1.0)	290 (11.4)
Average precipitation days (≥ 1.0 mm)	3.3	3.4	3.4	3.5	3.9	1.7	0.5	1.1	2.8	3.7	4.1	3.5	34.9
Average snowy days	0.1	0.1	0	0	0	0	0	0	0	0	0	0	0.2
Average relative humidity (%)	64	62	57	53	51	49	49	53	59	64	67	67	58
Mean monthly sunshine hours	181	179	210	244	282	318	343	305	230	204	172	166	2,825
Source 1: Agencia Estatal de Meteorología (normals 1981-2010)
Source 2: Agencia Estatal de Meteorología (extremes only 1940-2021)

== Demographics ==
Alcantarilla was for some years the most widely populated municipality in Spain given its land area. It is still the most densely populated place in the Region of Murcia with over 2,500 people per square kilometre. This changed when, in 1987, its surface (5.58 km^{2}) increased in 10.2 km^{2} through the addition of some land from the municipality of Murcia. Alcantarilla then rose from its initial 5.5 km^{2} to today's 15.54 km^{2}.

Despite its relatively small land area, the town has different quarters or areas. These are: San Pedro, San Roque, Campoamor, San José Obrero, Vistabella, Cabezo Verde, Las Tejeras, Florentino Gómez, Santa Rosa de Lima, Cayitas and El Potrox.

Population trend:

1900	1910	1920	1930	1940	1950	1960	1970	1981	1991	1996	2001	2004	2005
4.972	5.680	6.411	7.837	10.744	13.229	15.748	19.895	24.406	30.070	31.872	34.263	37.439	40.193

== Economy ==
The economy of Alcantarilla is mainly based on the industrial sector, as well as on the service sector and trade. The most important industrial area is set in the industrial estate called Poligono Industrial Oeste, shared with the municipality of Murcia, and where most of the enterprises in the town are. The trade and the service sector is focused on the fish market and cattle. The municipal fish market of San Pedro Apóstol is a remarkable center of market auction on the Mediterranean coast and it is considered the third most important indoor marketplace in Spain. The cattle market is basically aimed for the region of Levante, Andalusia and part of Castilla - La Mancha.

Other emblematic business found in Alcantarilla are Hero Spain, Bayern or Derivados Químicos.

Complete listings and reviews of businesses in Alcantarilla can be found online at the Town Hall of Alcantarilla website.

== Transport ==
Alcantarilla is well linked by road to the rest of municipalities in the Region of Murcia. The Renfe railway lines Cartagena-Chinchilla-Madrid y Águilas-Murcia-Alicante link the town to the centre and south-east of Spain. Similarly, several motorways link the town with different points of Murcia and Spain. These include the Autopista del Mediterráneo (A-7), Autovía A-30 (Madrid/Albacete/Murcia/Cartagena), Autovía de Andalucía (A-7/E-15), and Autovía MU-30 (El Palmar/Alcantarilla), which links the A-30 with the A-7/E-15 and recently the Autovía MU-31 (connects the A-30 with MU-30). The MU-31 is still under construction. Public transport in the city consists largely of its bus network, currently franchised to the bus company LATbus, which connects Alcantarilla with all nearby towns, including the city of Murcia.

== Education ==
Alcantarilla has five public high schools, called IES in Spanish (IES Fco. Salzillo, IES Alcántara, IES Sanje, IES Samaniego and IES Sagrado Corazón) as well as numerous public primary schools. The town does not have a university of its own, and students usually go to any of the three universities of the Autonomous Community of Murcia (i.e. University of Murcia, Universidad Politécnica de Cartagena or Universidad Católica de Murcia) or to universities in neighbouring autonomous communities.

== Facilities ==
=== Health ===
Alcantarilla has two health centres, the Centro de Salud Campoamor and the Centro de Salud San Pedro. The town also has a private Hospital, the Clínica San José. The town does not have a hospital of its own due to the proximity of the Hospital Virgen de la Arrixaca, (the largest of the Autonomous Community of the Region of Murcia), less than ten kilometres away, in El Palmar, one of the districts of the municipality of Murcia.

=== Sports ===
Sporting facilities in Alcantarilla are numerous. These include an outdoor-swimming pool open during the summer and a heated indoor-swimming pool, open in autumn, winter and spring. Next to the indoor-swimming pool lies a large brand-new sports complex (2.053 m^{2}), inaugurated in 2006. This complex (Pabellón Polideportivo de Entrevias) is next to the primary public school Jara Carrillo.

The town is host to several sporting associationations like the cycling association Peña Ciclista Guerrita or the football club Nueva Vanguardia -Alcantarilla C. F. A full listing of all the sporting associations and clubs in Alcantarilla can be found in the municipality's website.

=== Cultural ===
Alcantarilla has several cultural facilities, most notably the Centro Cultural Infanta Elena, a centre for cultural activities inaugurated by one of King Juan Carlos the First's daughters, the Infanta Elena, from whom the centre takes its name. Regular cultural events and exhibitions take place in it and they engage a large number of citizens.

=== Parks, gardens and squares ===
Alcantarilla has many different squares, parks and gardens, where citizens typically gather to chat, play, walk, have drinks or in the ice-cream parlours, bars or restaurants found nearby. The squares include the Plaza de San Pedro, which contains the town hall, the Jardín de la Constitución (also known as Jardín de las Palomas) or the Jardin de Campoamor.

=== Town centre ===
Nightlife focusses mainly around the so-called "recinto de Entrevias", in the town centre, where a vibrant nightlife is found particularly on Friday evenings and where thousands crowd during the local festivities of May. This is also the site of the international trade fair show.

=== Shopping ===
Alcantarilla has a large number of shops, particularly along the Calle Mayor (Main Street), which crosses the town from one edge to the other. In addition, two huge street markets, one in the area of Campoamor and the other near Plaza de San Francisco (San Francisco Square) are also held every Wednesday.

=== Air Base ===
Alcantarilla hosts a Base of the Ejército del Aire y del Espacio de España. Paratroopers are trained there, and there is also a squadron of CASA C-212 Aviocar light transport planes.

== Highlights and landmarks ==
=== Monuments ===
==== Civil ====
- Rueda o Noria (Medieval water wheel)

This monument is formed by the hydraulic remains belonging to a traditional control system which irrigated the orchards of Murcia. When the Arabs first came to the Iberian Peninsula, they found a primitive form of a Roman irrigation network. After making scientific studies of the land, they greatly improved this network, constructing many hydraulic arrangements for irrigating the whole of their domain. Rivers and wells were exploited and underground sources of water were discovered. Channels were cut, even in solid rock, dams built and the windmill introduced from the East. The water-wheel or "noria" (from the Arabic naura) was also brought from the eastern lands. With ingenious feats of engineering they provided water everywhere. The Region of Murcia was no exception and, around or on the Segura River there were several mills operational between the 13th and 15th centuries. The water wheel or "noria" (from the Arabic naura) of Alcantarilla, on the acequia Mayor de Alquibla or "Barreras" acequia, goes back to medieval times. The first modern wheel was built in 1457. This first wheel and subsequent ones were wooden but in the nineteenth century, an iron wheel was built. The present wheel is from 1956, based on the proportions of the previous one from 1890 (11 metres high, 1.90 m wide).

- Casa Cayitas o de la Inquisición (18th century)

Also known as Casa del Santo Oficio (House of the Holy Office), it was built in the 18th century, and it hosted for many years the Tribunal Comarcal de La Inquisición or local Inquisition tribunal. The Inquisition was already present in Alcantarilla in the 15th century. However, factual documents date from 1742. The coat of arms found on the façade, the Cross flanked by a sword and a laurel, testifies to this former episode of this monument and the town. In 1982 it was declared "Monumento Histórico Artístico de carácter nacional", or nationally relevant historic monument and it was restored by local and regional authorities. At present, the monument houses Alcantarilla's Municipal Library. At the end of the 19th and beginning of the 20th centuries, the house was inhabited by Ms. Caya Arias Castellanos, and later on her daughter Ms. Caya López Arias and the present name derives from these owners.

- Casa Consistorial (Town Hall)
- El Puente de la Pólvora

==== Religious ====
- Iglesia Parroquial de la Asunción (20th century).
- Convento de los Padres Mínimos (1699–1704).
- Iglesia de San Roque (17th/18th century)
- Iglesia Parroquial de San Pedro Apóstol
- Ermita de Nuestra Señora de la Salud (1970s)
- Ermita Nuestra Señora de la Paz
- Ermita de la Voz Negra

=== Museums ===
- Museo Etnológico de la Huerta de Murcia

Inaugurated in 1968, this museum has been declared "National Artistic Historic Monument" by means of the Royal Decree 1757/1982. The museum has two main parts: an indoor area and an outdoor area. The indoor exhibition halls display collections of instruments and tools traditionally used in the Murcian Huerta (the traditional orchards around the town of Murcia) in past centuries and up to the first half of the twentieth century. The collections include pottery, handcrafted furniture, farming implements, metalware, local musical instruments, etc. Mannequins dressed up in ancient typical costumes (wedding and luxury dress, worker costume, lace-maker costume, sericicultural tasks carried out in the orchard and household activities (19th century) are also on display. In the outdoor area there are, among other things, a Barraca, the typical house in the orchards of Murcia, and outside of it: a Moorish oven or a water wheel or Noria, a monument formed by the hydraulic remains belonging to a traditional control system which irrigated the orchards of Murcia.

=== Local festivities ===
==== Civil ====
- Fiestas de mayo (May Festivities)

These are Alcantarilla's most colourful festivities par excellence and attract thousands of people from the town itself, other towns in the Region of Murcia, neighbouring autonomous communities and even from abroad. They are officially declared as a tourist attraction of on a regional scale. They are always held on the last two weeks of May. The festivities feature free public live concerts by national and internationally acclaimed artists as well as folkloric performances from different countries in a Folklore Festival. The "peñas" or party groups made up of people from the town play a major part in the festivities and take significant names such as Piscis, El Barco, El Sombrero, El Cencerro, Baco, Zeus, Vintitantos, El Clavel, Sol y Sombra, Los Flamencos, El Chache y sus sobrinos, Atenea, El Beato, Campoamor, or Los Brujos. The day of the Ofrenda Floral (floral offering) to the patron saint, on the last Friday, is an explosion of colour and joy in which thousands of citizens dressed in the traditional regional costumes parade. The whole of the town takes part, either in the parades or as a member of the public. On the last Saturday, a parade involving featuring high floats overloaded with cheerful members of the "peñas" moves through the centre of the town, handing out the toys, plastic footballs and sweets fill their floats. The festivities also feature the "burning of the witch", symbolising the town's popular interpretation of the historical presence of the Inquisition during the eighteenth and nineteenth centuries in the town.

- February carnival

As many towns and cities in the world, Alcantarilla celebrates the Carnival Season with public celebrations and parades. The carnival parades in Alcantarilla include the so-called Carnaval Infantil (Children's Carnival) in which over 1,500 disguised children parade the town and hold a big party in the city centre with contests, performances, workshops and free shows. It is always held on a Friday afternoon. The adult carnival takes place on Sunday, when different "comparsas" (groups or masquerades) from both the town and elsewhere parade the streets of the town. Among the most important local masquerades are Orinoco, Korumbá, Iguazú, Denébola and Nuevos Pasos.

==== Religious ====
- Semana Santa (Holy Week)

The Holy Week festivities are amongst the most popular celebrations in Alcantarilla. The Holy Week processions consist of the marching of colourful brotherhoods bearing elaborate sculptured scenes depicting the most important events in the life of Jesus from the day he arrived in Jerusalem until his resurrection as told by the Bible.

- Navidad y Reyes (Christmas)

Like numerous towns and cities in Spain, these festivities feature the so-called Three Kings Procession. According to Hispanic tradition, gifts are exchanged on Epiphany rather than Christmas Day and children eagerly await the "Reyes Magos" (or Three Wise Kings), who bring them presents if they have been good or sugar candy coal if they have been naughty. Epiphany is celebrated by staging a big parade or "Cabalgata de Reyes" featuring the Three Kings, who shower the crowds of adults and children with sweets and little toys.

== See also ==
- List of municipalities in the Region of Murcia
