= Christ of Monteagudo =

Statue in Murcia, Spain

- Cristo de Monteagudo
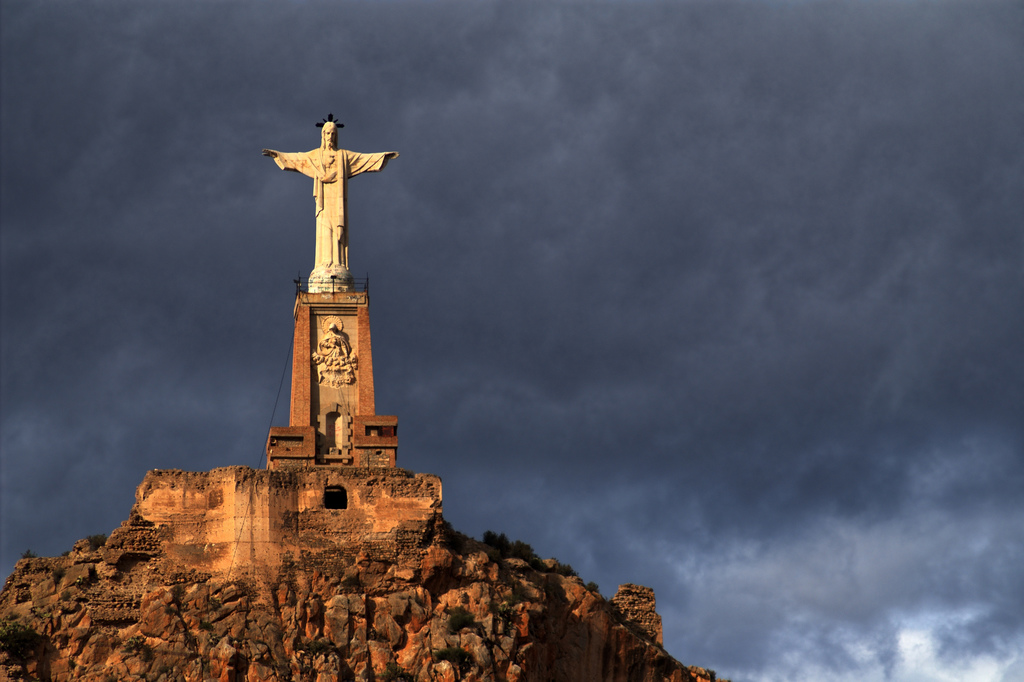
- Interactive map of Christ of Monteagudo
- Location: Castle of Monteagudo, Murcia, Spain
- Coordinates: 38.020282°N 1.097969°W
- Designer: Nicolás Martínez Ramón
- Height: 14 metres (46 ft), 34 metres (112 ft) with its pedestal
- Opening date: 28 October 1951

The Christ of Monteagudo is a colossal statue of Jesus located on top of the Castle of Monteagudo, in Murcia, Spain.

== History and description ==
There was a previous statue of Jesus on top of the hill, sculpted by Anastasio Martínez Hernández and inaugurated on 31 October 1926. It was demolished after an agreement voted by the Municipal Council in November 1936, in the midst of the Spanish Civil War.

The second and current iteration of the sculpture was a work by Nicolás Martínez Ramón, son of Anastasio Martínez Hernández. 14 metre high and placed on a 20 metre plinth, it stands 4 metres higher than its predecessor. It was unveiled on 28 October 1951.

Built on a public plot, in 2010 a requirement was filed by two lawyers before the Directorate-General of State Patrimony, dependent on the Ministry of Economy and Finance to ask for the removal of the monument as they considered a public space was being used for religious purposes, arguing that "that Christ is an intruder and an attempt against the religious freedom and the non-confessionalism of the State" and considering a "provocation" the existence of a reproduction of Jesus Christ on one of the landmarks better representing the splendour of the Islamic period of Murcia. The requirement was eventually dismissed by the High Court of Justice of Madrid in 2015 on the basis the monument was "part of the cultural tradition of Murcia".

By 2018, the monument presented a bad state of conservation, with pieces of concrete falling from the fingers of the statue and gaps in the joints of the pieces.
