= Murcia =

- Municipality
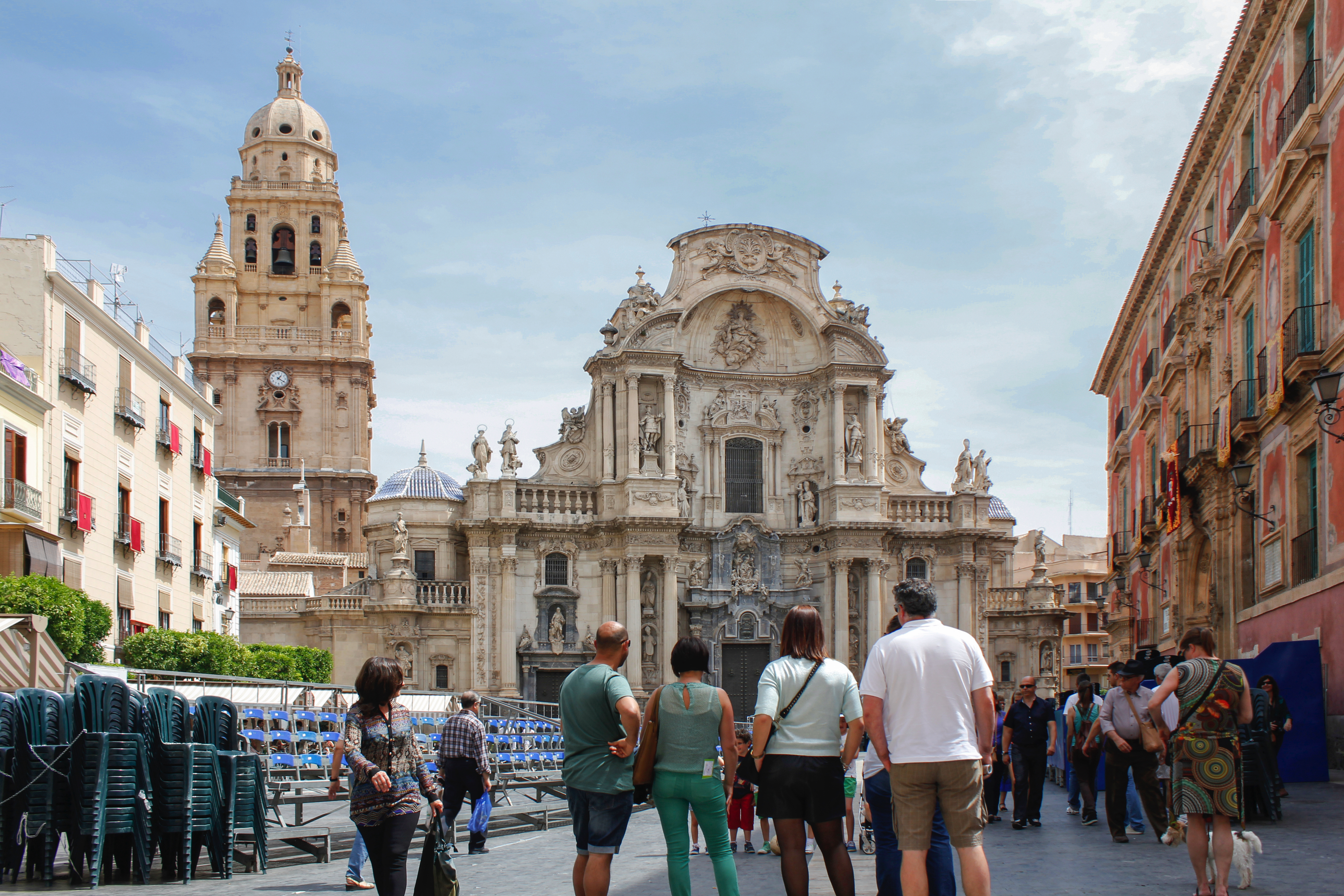
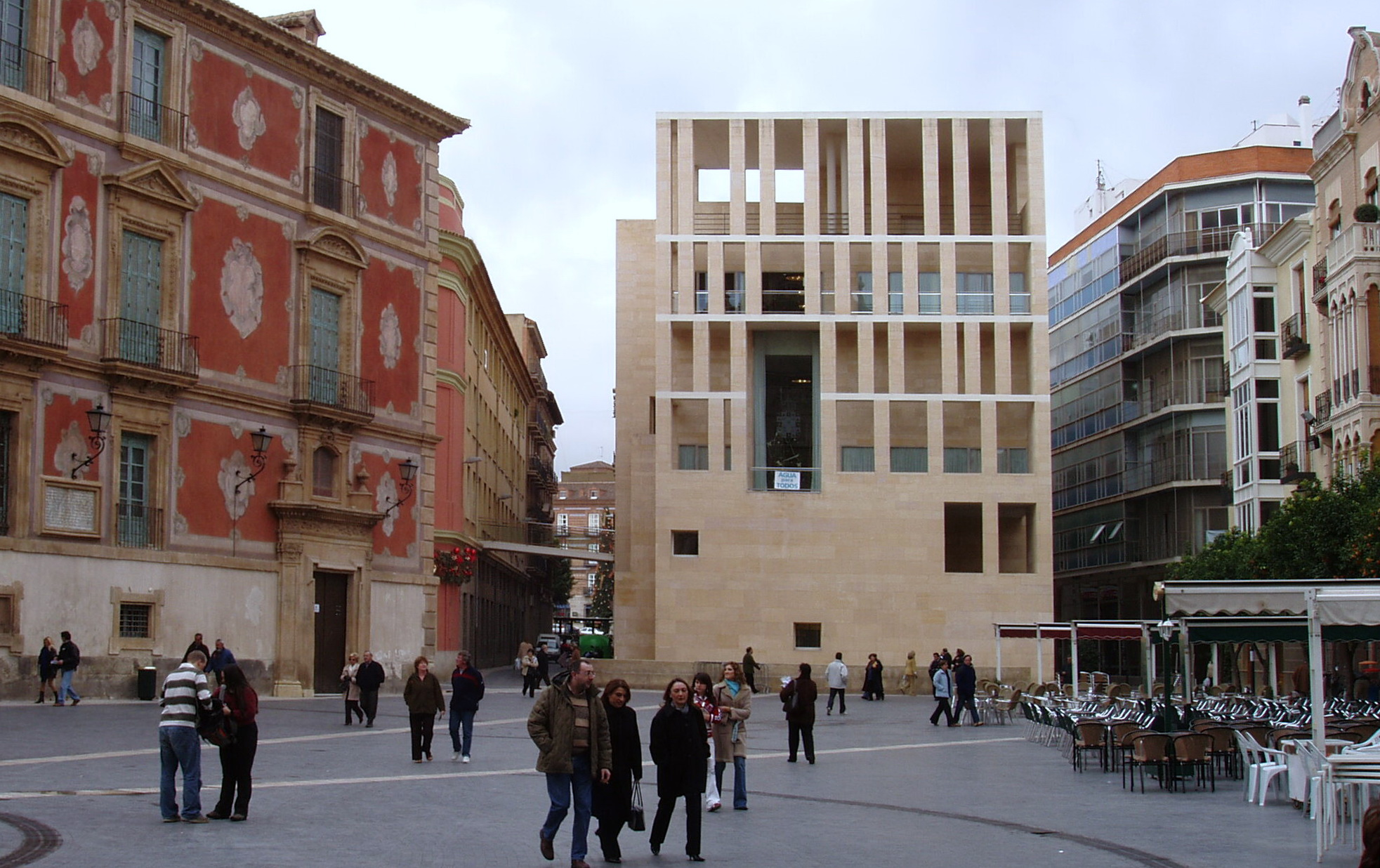
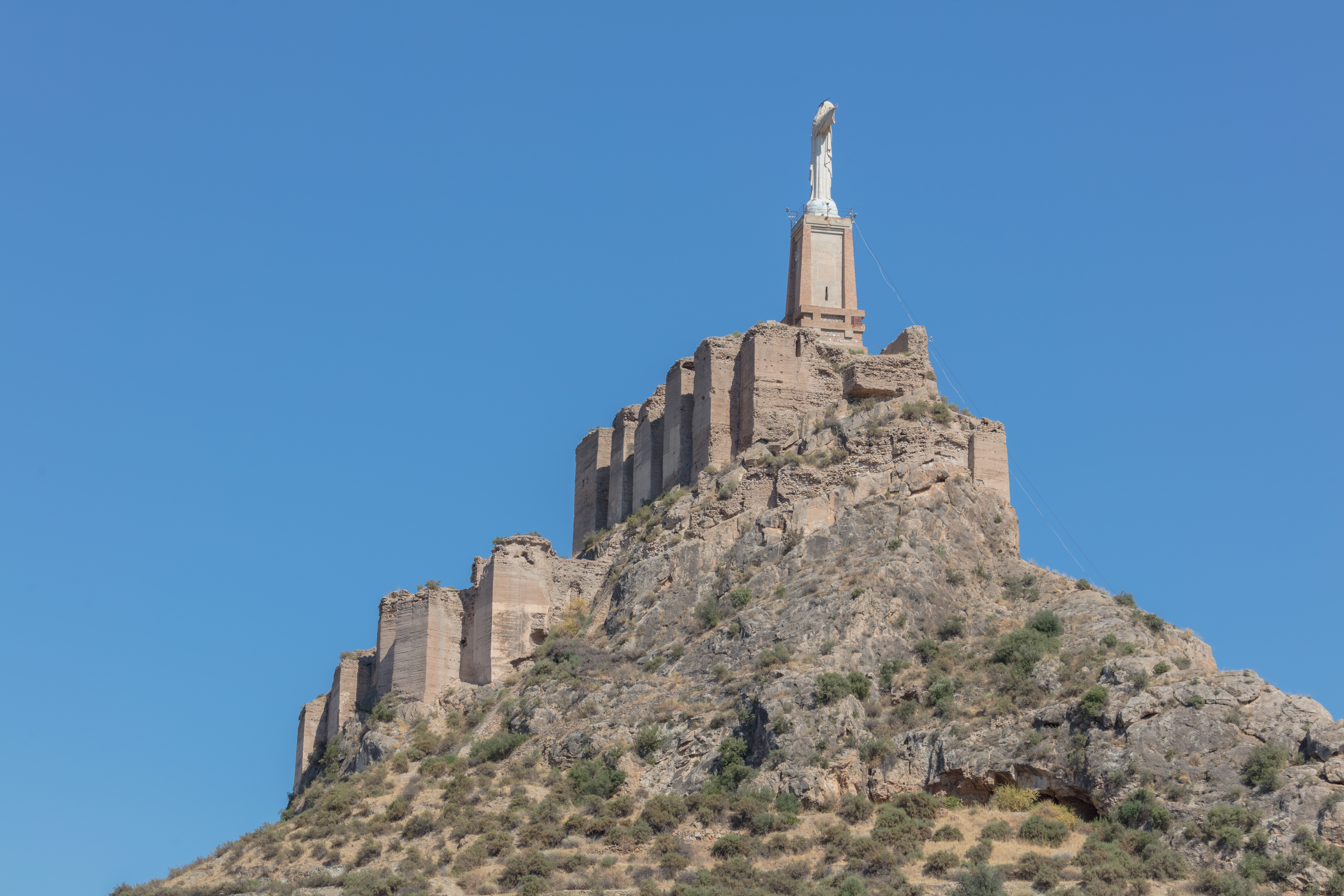
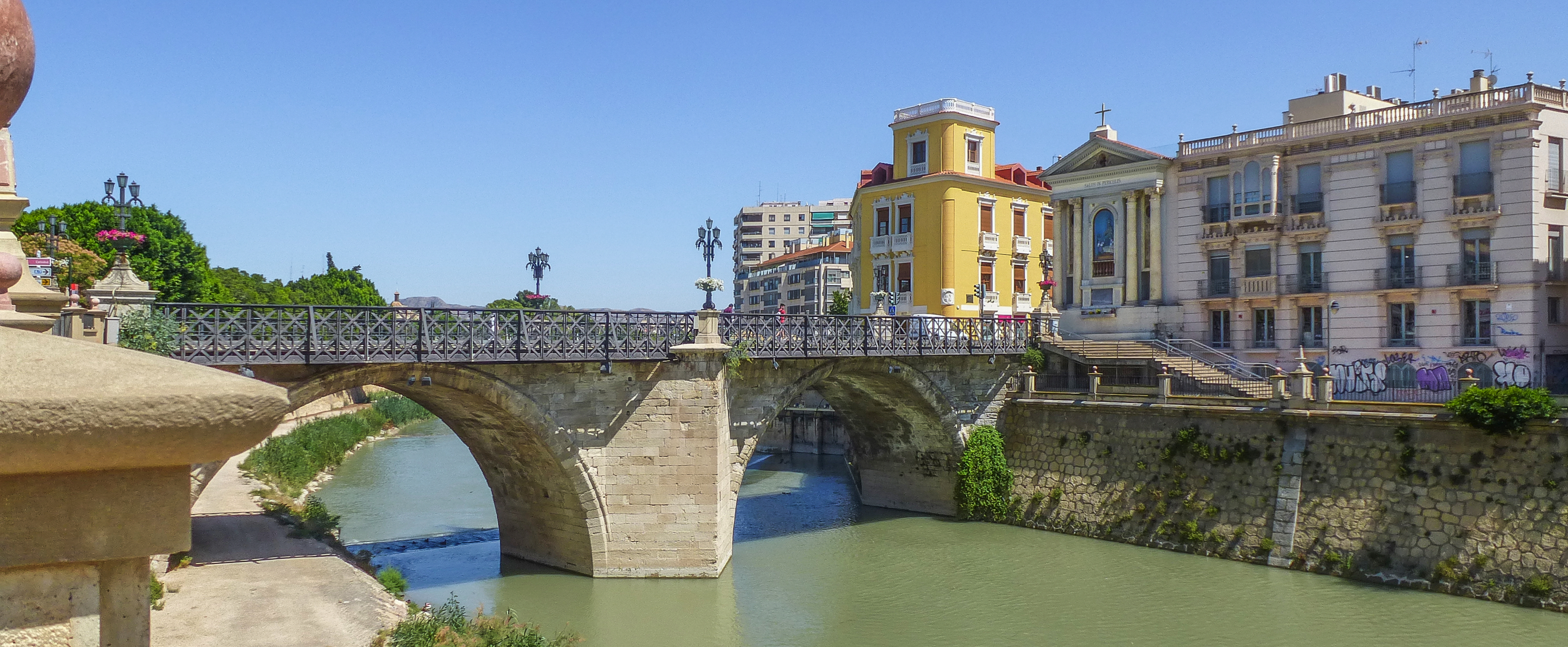
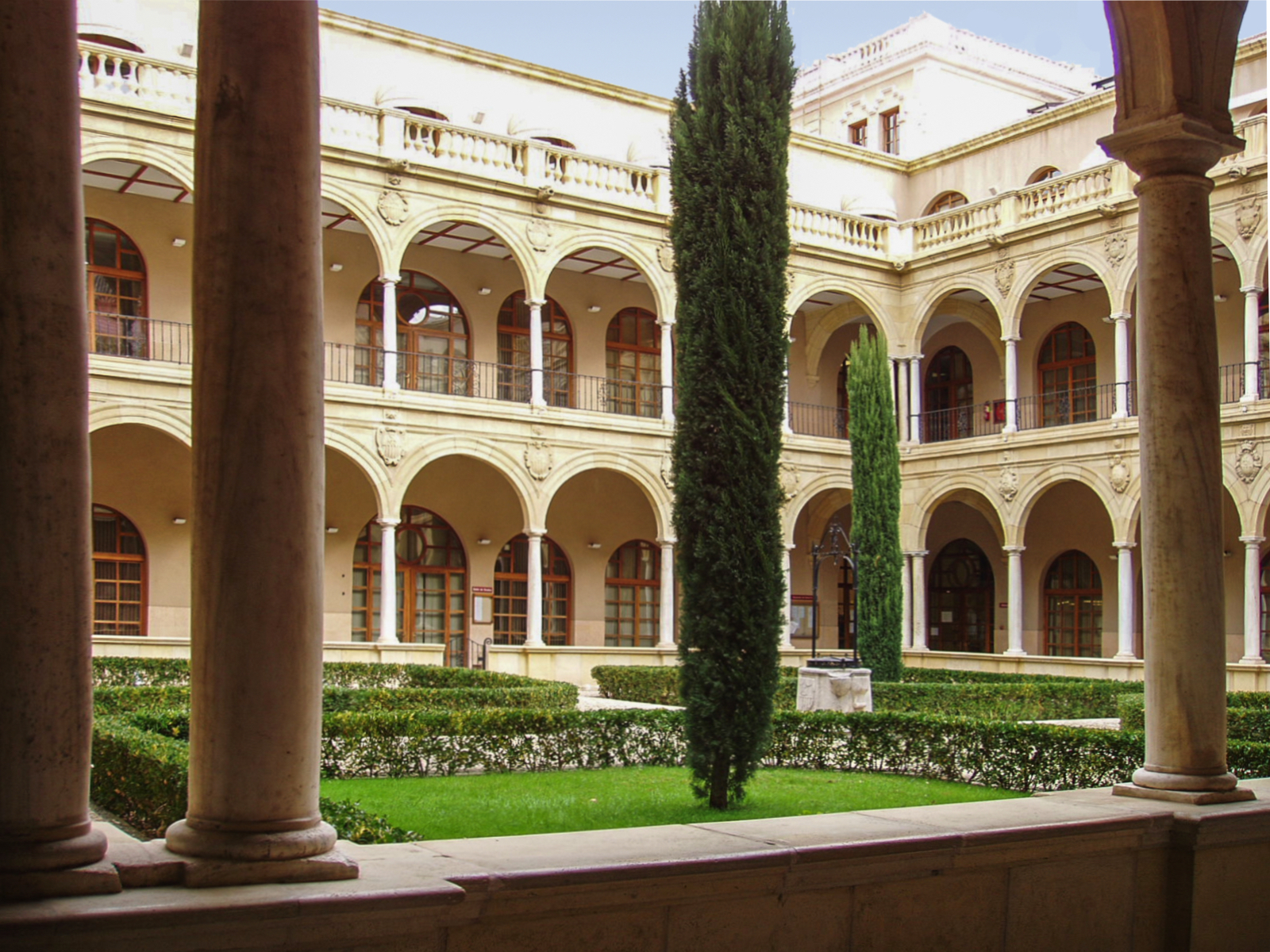
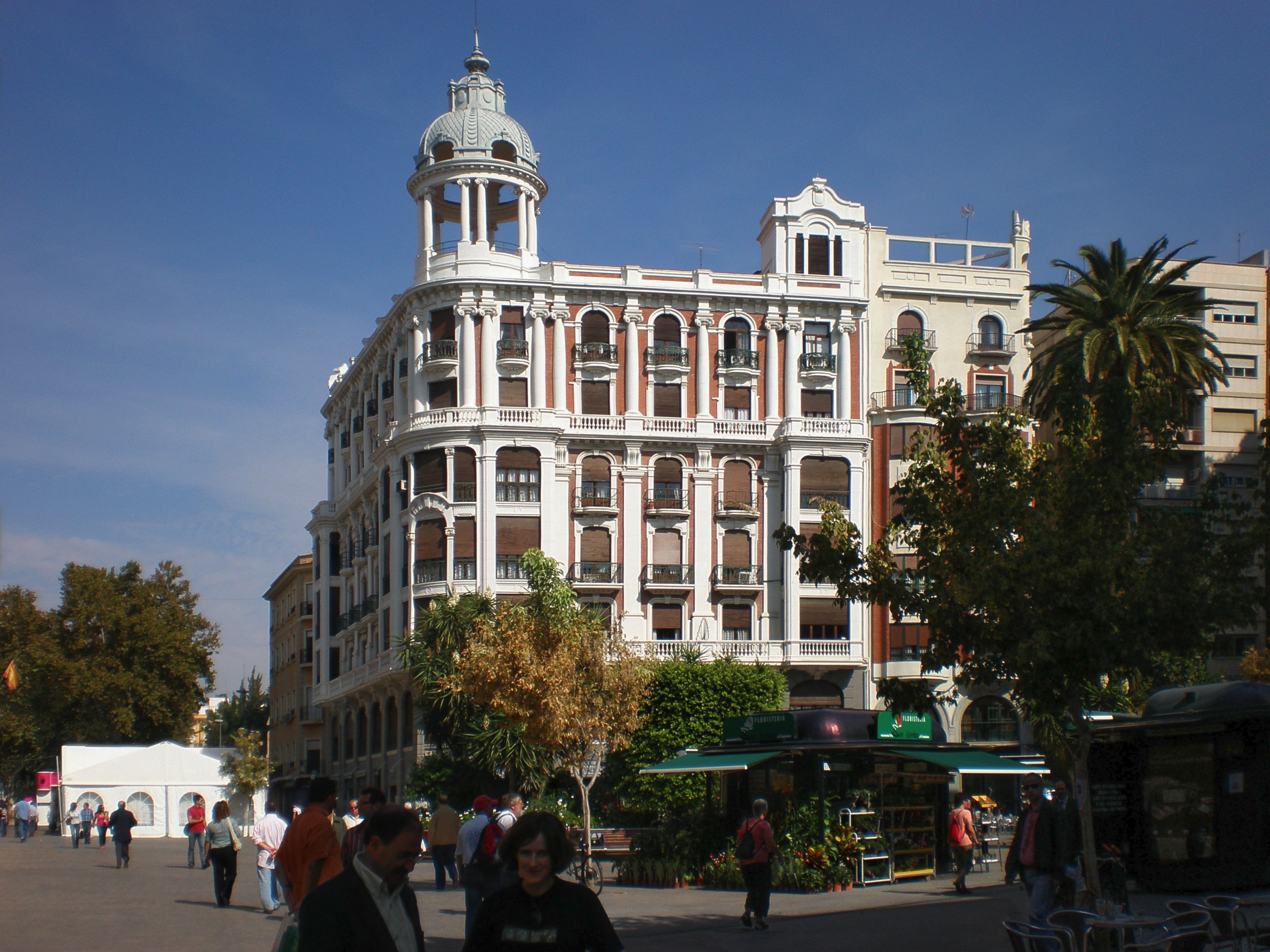
- Cathedral City hall (Moneo) Monteagudo Castle The Old Bridge University cloister Casa Cerdá

- Flag Coat of arms
- Location of Murcia
- Coordinates: 37°59′00″N 1°07′49″W
- Country: Spain
- Autonomous community: Region of Murcia
- Founded: 825 AD (by Abd ar-Rahman II)

Government
  - Mayor: Rebeca Pérez (PP)

Area
  - Municipality: 881.86 km^{2} (340.49 sq mi)
- Elevation: 43 m (141 ft)

Population (2024)
  - Municipality: 471,982 (7th)
  - Density: 535.21/km^{2} (1,386.2/sq mi)
  - Urban (2020): 672,773
- Demonym: Murciano/a

GDP
  - Metro: €29.720 billion (2020)
- Time zone: UTC+1 (CET)
  - Summer (DST): UTC+2 (CEST)
- Postal code: 30001 to 30012
- Dialing code: 968 / 868
- Website: Official website

Murcia (/ˈmʊərsiə/ MOOR-see-ə, US also /ˈmɜːrʃ(i)ə/ MUR-sh(ee-)ə, Spanish: [ˈmuɾθja]) is a city in south-eastern Spain, and the capital and most populous city of the autonomous community of the Region of Murcia. As of 2024, with a population of 479,405, it is the 7th-largest city in Spain. The total population of the metropolitan area was 672,773 in 2020, covering an urban area of 1,230.9 km^{2}. It is located on the Segura River, in the southeast of the Iberian Peninsula. It has a climate with hot summers, mild winters, and relatively low precipitation.

Murcia was founded by Abd ar-Rahman II, Emir of Cordoba, in 825 with the name Mursiyah (Arabic: مرسية). It is now mainly a services city and a university town. Highlights for visitors include the Cathedral of Murcia and a number of baroque buildings, renowned local cuisine, Holy Week procession, works of art by the famous Murcian sculptor Francisco Salzillo, and the Fiestas de Primavera (Spring Festival).

The city, as the capital of the comarca Huerta de Murcia, is called "Europe's orchard" due to its long agricultural tradition and its fruit, vegetable, and flower production and exports.

== History ==
The territory has been inhabited by humans since prehistory. People also lived in the current municipality during the Bronze and Iron Ages. During the late Chalcolithic and the Bronze Age, the occupancy of part of the current municipality was performed by the Argaric people. During the late Bronze Age and the Iron Age, the people who inhabited the current municipality were the Iberians. A remarkable site is a religious building, whose name is the De la Luz Iberian Sanctuary. There are traces of people presence during the Roman rule in the Iberian Peninsula era. A construction of the late Roman period in the Iberian Peninsula is a fortress, Castillo de los Garres, located in the south of the northern half of the municipality.

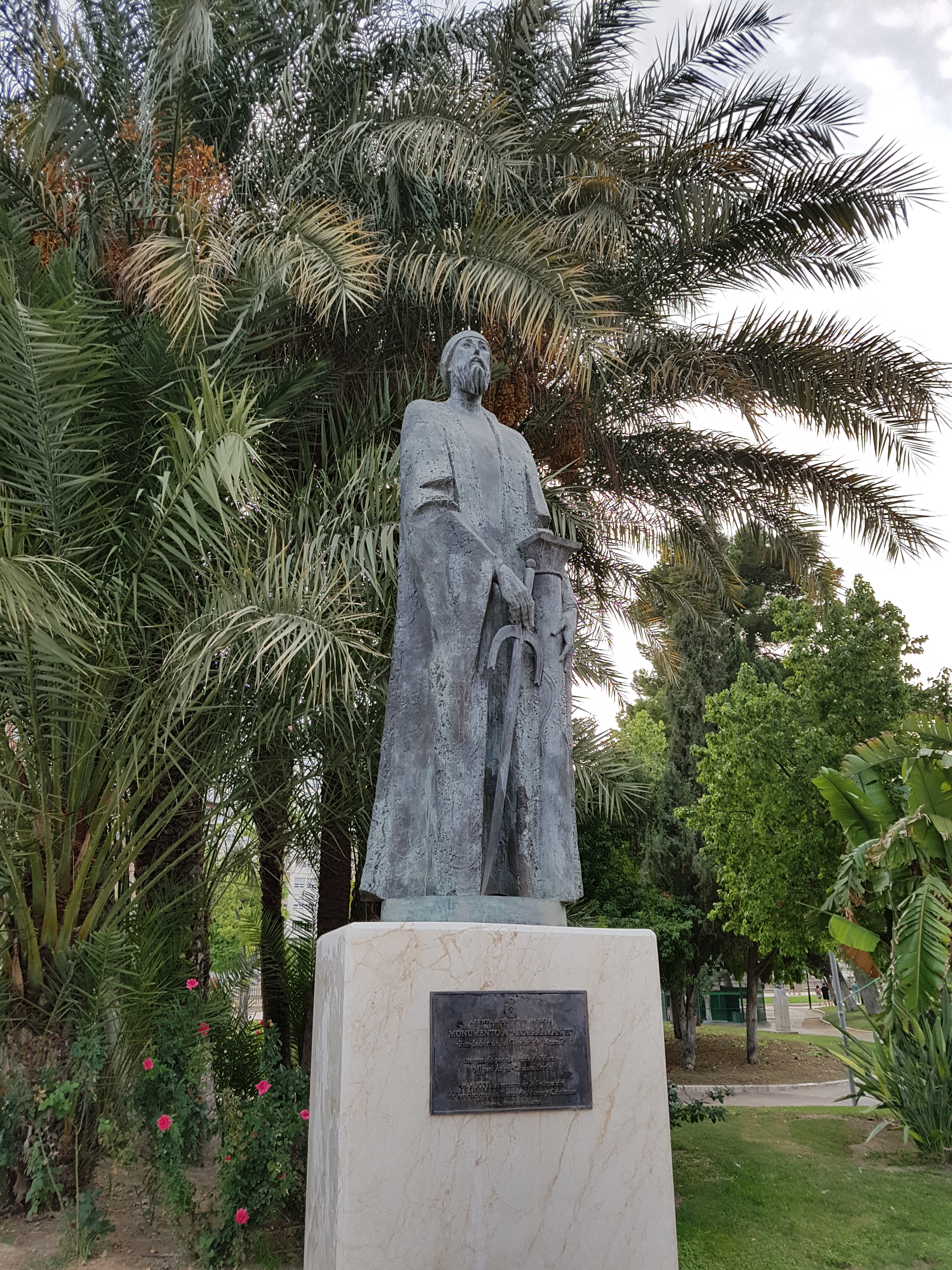
Statue of Abd ar-Rahman II in Murcia

It is widely believed that Murcia's name is derived from the Latin word myrtea or murtea, meaning land of the myrtle (the plant is known to grow in the general area), although it may also be a derivation of the word Murtia, which would mean Murtius Village (Murtius was a common Roman name). Other research suggests that it may owe its name to the Latin Murtae (Mulberry), which covered the regional landscape for many centuries. The Latin name eventually changed into the Arabic Mursiya, and then, Murcia.

The city in its present location was founded with the name Madinat Mursiyah (مدينة مرسية 'city of Murcia') in AD 825 by Abd ar-Rahman II, who was then the emir of Córdoba. Umayyad planners, taking advantage of the course of the river Segura, created an imaginative and complex network of irrigation channels that made the town's agricultural existence prosperous. In the 12th century the traveller and writer Muhammad al-Idrisi described the city of Murcia as populous and strongly fortified. After the fall of the Caliphate of Córdoba in 1031, Murcia passed under the successive rules of the powers seated variously at Almería and Toledo, but finally became capital of its own kingdom with Ibn Tahir (أبو عبد الرحمن بن طاهر). After the fall of the Almoravide empire, Ibn Mardanis made Murcia the capital of a new independent kingdom. At this time, Murcia was a very prosperous city, famous for its ceramics, exported to Italian towns, as well as for silk and paper industries, the first in Europe. The coinage of Murcia was considered as model in all the continent. The mystic Ibn Arabi (1165–1240) and the poet Ibn al-Jinan (d.1214) were born in Murcia during this period.

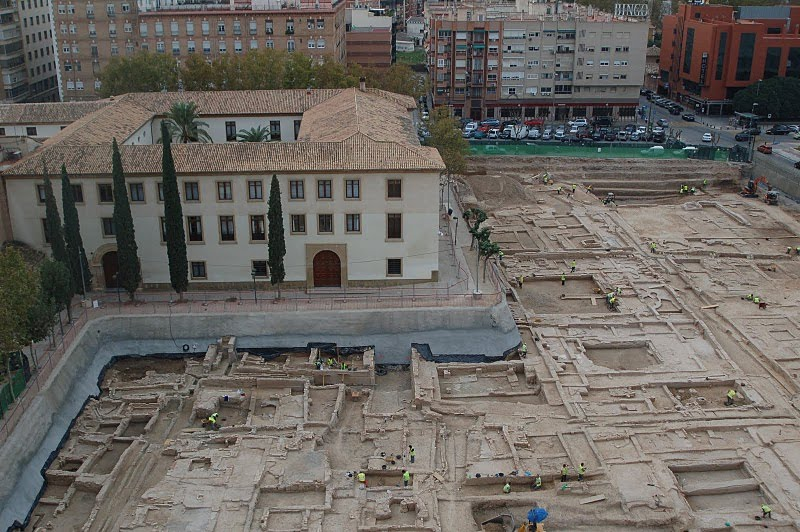
The 13th-century archaeological site of San Esteban

In 1172 Murcia was conquered by the north African Almohades, the last Muslim empire to rule southern Spain, and as the forces of the Christian Reconquista gained the upper hand, was the capital of a small Muslim emirate from 1223 to 1243. By the treaty of Alcaraz, in 1243, the Christian king Ferdinand III of Castile made Murcia a protectorate, getting access to the Mediterranean sea while Murcia was protected against Granada and Aragon. The Christian population of the town became the majority as immigrants poured in from almost all parts of the Iberian Peninsula, with Muslims confined to the suburb of Arrixaca. Christian immigration was encouraged with the goal of establishing a loyal Christian base. These measures led to the Muslim popular revolt in 1264, which was quelled by James I of Aragon in 1266, conquering Murcia and bringing Aragonese and Catalan immigrants with him.

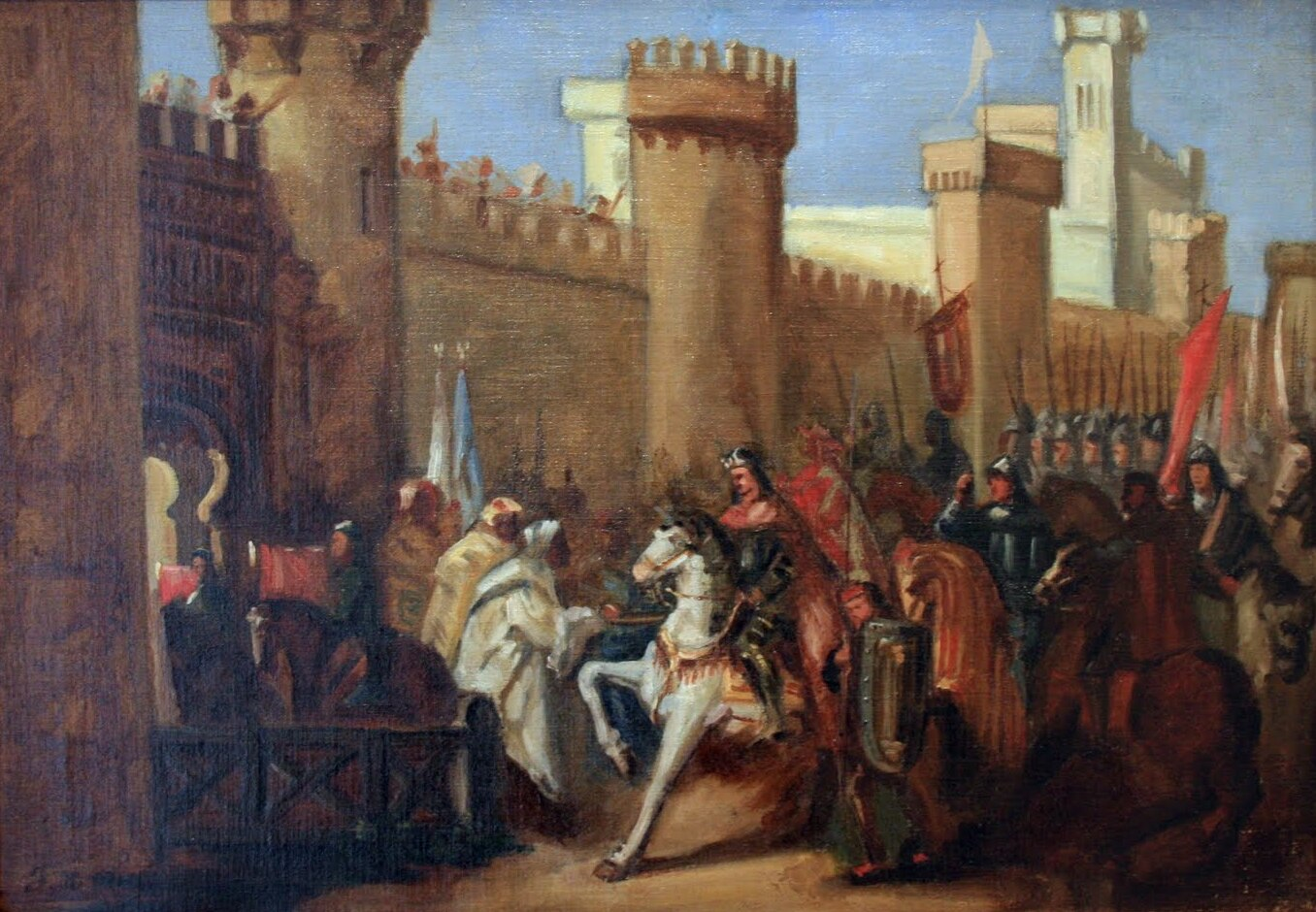
Entrance of James I of Aragon at Murcia in 1266

After this, during the reign of Alfonso X of Castile, Murcia was one of his capitals with Toledo and Seville.

The Murcian duality: Catalan population in a Castilian territory, brought the subsequent conquest of the city by James II of Aragon in 1296. In 1304, Murcia was finally incorporated into Castile under the Treaty of Torrellas.

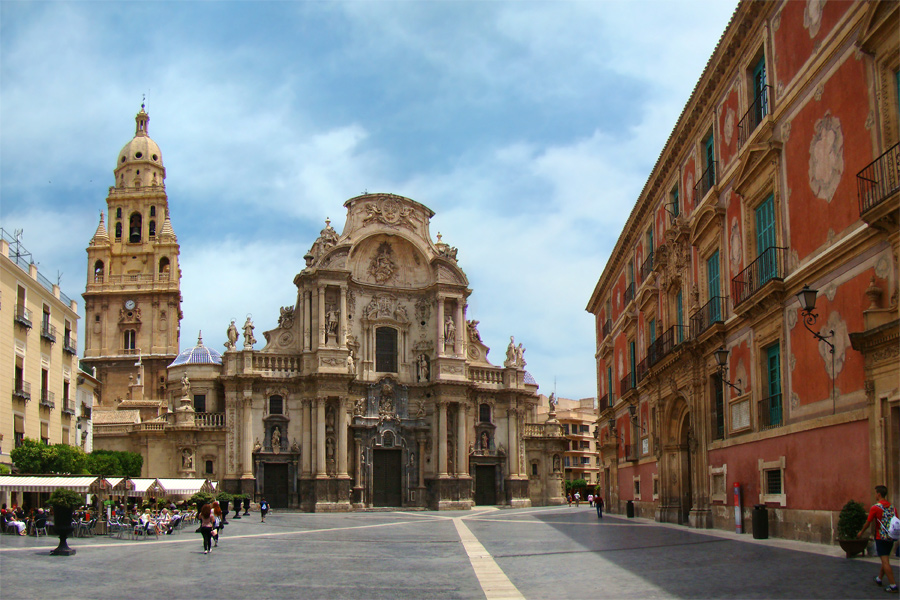
Murcia Cathedral of Santa Maria completed in 1465, with facade and tower from 18th century

Murcia's prosperity declined as the Mediterranean lost trade to the ocean routes and from the wars between the Christians and the Ottoman Empire. The old prosperity of Murcia became crises during 14th century because of its border location with the neighbouring Muslim kingdom of Granada, but flourished after its conquest in 1492 and again in the 18th century, benefiting greatly from a boom in the silk industry. Most of the modern city's landmark churches, monuments and old architecture date from this period. In this century, Murcia lived an important role in Bourbon victory in the War of the Spanish Succession, thanks to Cardinal Belluga. In 1810, Murcia was looted by Napoleonic troops; it then suffered a major earthquake in 1829. According to contemporaneous accounts, an estimated 6,000 people died from the disaster's effects across the province. Plague and cholera followed.

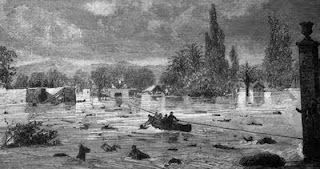
Murcia Flood in 1879

The town and surrounding area suffered badly from floods in 1651, 1879, 1946 and 1948, though the construction of a levee helped to stave off the repeated floods from the Segura. A popular pedestrian walkway, the Malecon, runs along the top of the levee.

Murcia has been the capital of the province of Murcia since 1833 and, with its creation by the central government in 1982, capital of the autonomous community (which includes only the city and the province). Since then, it has become the seventh most populated municipality in Spain, and a thriving services city.

The 5.1 M_{w} Lorca earthquake shook the Region of Murcia with a maximum Mercalli intensity of VII ('Very strong') on 11 May 2011. Nine people were killed and over 400 were injured.

== Geography ==
Murcia is located near the center of a low-lying fertile plain known as the huerta (orchard or vineyard) of Murcia. The Segura River and its right-hand tributary, the Guadalentín, run through the area. The city has an elevation of 43 metres (141 ft) above sea level and its municipality covers approximately 882 square kilometres (341 sq mi).

The best known and most dominant aspect of the municipal area's landscape is the orchard. In addition to the orchard and urban zones, the great expanse of the municipal area is made up of different landscapes: badlands, groves of Carrasco pine trees in the precoastal mountain ranges and, towards the south, a semi-steppe region. A large natural park, the Parque Regional de Carrascoy y el Valle, lies just to the south of the city.

=== Segura River ===
The Segura River crosses an alluvial plain (Vega Media del Segura), part of a Mediterranean pluvial system. The river crosses the city from west to east. Its volumetric flow is mostly small but the river is known to produce occasional flooding, like the times when the capital was inundated, in 1946, 1948, 1973 and 1989.

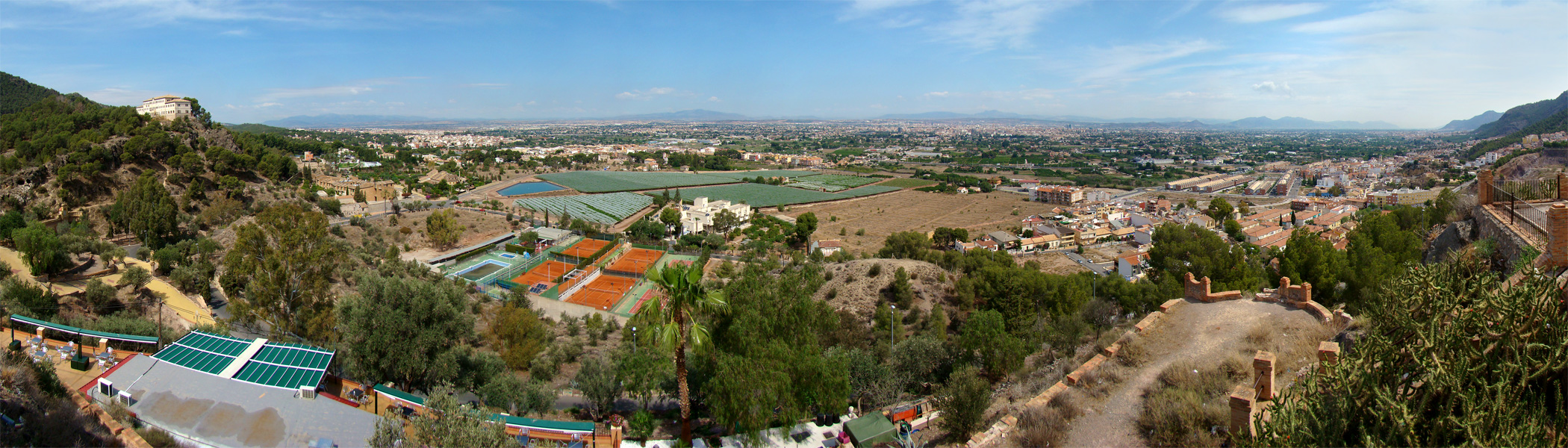
Murcia is located in the Segura valley

=== Mountains and hills ===
The Segura river's Valley is surrounded by two mountain ranges, the hills of Guadalupe, Espinardo, Cabezo de Torres, Esparragal and Monteagudo in the north and the Cordillera Sur in the south. The municipality itself is divided into southern and northern zones by a series of mountain ranges, the aforementioned Cordillera Sur (Carrascoy, El Puerto, Villares, Columbares, Altaona, and Escalona). These two zones are known as Field of Murcia (in the south of Cordillera Sur) and Orchard of Murcia (the Segura Valley in the north of Cordillera Sur). Near the plain's center, the steep hill of Monteagudo protrudes dramatically.

=== Districts ===
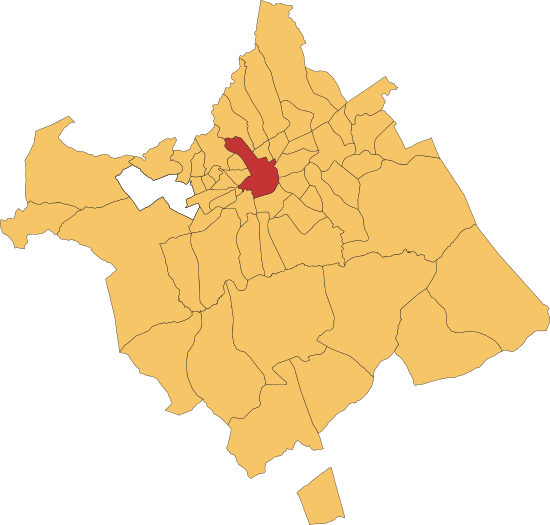
Map with the district demarcation and the main town highlighted

The 881.86-square-kilometre (340.49 sq mi) territory of Murcia's municipality is made up of 54 pedanías (suburban districts) and 28 barrios (city neighbourhood districts). The barrios make up the 12.86-square-kilometre (4.97 sq mi) the main urban portion of the city. The historic city center is approximately 3 square kilometres (1 sq mi) of the urbanised downtown portion of Murcia.

District	Population (2021)
La Albatalía	2,122
La Alberca	12,998
Algezares	5,717
Aljucer	7,761
Alquerías	6,286
La Arboleja	2,111
Baños y Mendigo	847
Barqueros	1,040
Beniaján	11,373
Cabezo de Torres	13,560
Cañada Hermosa	189
Cañadas de San Pedro	371
Carrascoy	104
Casillas	4,995
Churra	8,731
Cobatillas	2,701
Corvera	2,808
Los Dolores	5,189
Era Alta	3,251
El Esparragal	7,920
Garres y Lages	7,673
Gea y Truyols	1,251
Guadalupe	7,344
Javalí Nuevo	3,223
Javalí Viejo	2,292
Jerónimo y Avileses y Balsicas de Arriba	1,787
Lobosillo	1,893
Llano de Brujas	5,639

Los Martínez del Puerto	810
Monteagudo	4,036
Nonduermas	2,496
La Ñora	5,099
El Palmar	24,163
Puebla de Soto	1,836
Puente Tocinos	16,811
El Puntal	7,201
El Raal	6,385
Los Ramos	3,473
La Raya	2,255
Rincón Beniscornia	980
Rincón de Seca	2,251
San Benito	14,609
San Ginés	2,798
San José de la Vega	5,019
Sangonera la Seca	5,773
Sangonera la Verde	12,040
Santa Cruz	2,633
Santiago y Zaraiche	11,044
Santo Ángel	6,374
Sucina	2,314
Torreagüera	9,305
Valladolises y Lo Jurado	790
Zarandona	7,020
Zeneta	1,847
Murcia (town centre)	169,631
Total	460,349

=== Climate ===
Murcia has a hot semi-arid climate (Köppen climate classification: BSh). It has mild winters and very hot summers because of its inland location. It averages more than 320 days with sun per year. Occasionally, Murcia has heavy, torrential rain.

In the coldest month, January, the average temperature range is a high of 17.2 °C (63 °F) during the day and a low of 5.3 °C (42 °F) at night. Night frost occurs in most winters, but snow is very rare. Snow fell and accumulated in Murcia during the 20th century eight times, in 1910, 1914, 1926, 1942, 1951, 1957, 1971 and 1983, and twice in the 21st century in 2017 and 2021. In the warmest month, August, the range goes from 34.5 °C (94 °F) during the day to 21.8 °C (71 °F) at night. Temperatures almost always reach or exceed 40 °C (104 °F) on at least one or two days per year. The official record for Murcia stands at 46.2 °C (115.2 °F) and at Alcantarilla airport in the western suburbs on 15 August 2021 with 47.0 °C (116.6 °F).

Climate data for Murcia (1991–2020), extremes (1984–)
Month	Jan	Feb	Mar	Apr	May	Jun	Jul	Aug	Sep	Oct	Nov	Dec	Year
Record high °C (°F)	28.7 (83.7)	29.4 (84.9)	33.6 (92.5)	37.4 (99.3)	41.0 (105.8)	42.5 (108.5)	45.7 (114.3)	46.2 (115.2)	44.6 (112.3)	35.5 (95.9)	31.0 (87.8)	27.2 (81.0)	46.2 (115.2)
Mean maximum °C (°F)	23.3 (73.9)	24.9 (76.8)	28.7 (83.7)	30.4 (86.7)	34.0 (93.2)	37.7 (99.9)	39.8 (103.6)	39.8 (103.6)	36.4 (97.5)	32.1 (89.8)	26.6 (79.9)	23.4 (74.1)	41.0 (105.8)
Mean daily maximum °C (°F)	17.2 (63.0)	18.5 (65.3)	21.1 (70.0)	23.6 (74.5)	27.2 (81.0)	31.5 (88.7)	34.3 (93.7)	34.5 (94.1)	30.5 (86.9)	26.1 (79.0)	20.7 (69.3)	17.6 (63.7)	25.2 (77.4)
Daily mean °C (°F)	11.3 (52.3)	12.4 (54.3)	14.8 (58.6)	17.2 (63.0)	20.7 (69.3)	24.9 (76.8)	27.8 (82.0)	28.1 (82.6)	24.6 (76.3)	20.3 (68.5)	15.0 (59.0)	12.0 (53.6)	19.1 (66.4)
Mean daily minimum °C (°F)	5.3 (41.5)	6.3 (43.3)	8.4 (47.1)	10.7 (51.3)	14.2 (57.6)	18.2 (64.8)	21.2 (70.2)	21.8 (71.2)	18.6 (65.5)	14.6 (58.3)	9.4 (48.9)	6.3 (43.3)	12.9 (55.2)
Mean minimum °C (°F)	0.0 (32.0)	1.3 (34.3)	3.2 (37.8)	6.2 (43.2)	9.4 (48.9)	14.1 (57.4)	18.2 (64.8)	18.4 (65.1)	14.1 (57.4)	9.1 (48.4)	3.4 (38.1)	0.9 (33.6)	−1.0 (30.2)
Record low °C (°F)	−7.5 (18.5)	−3.9 (25.0)	−2.4 (27.7)	0.0 (32.0)	4.0 (39.2)	8.0 (46.4)	13.0 (55.4)	14.0 (57.2)	9.6 (49.3)	4.4 (39.9)	−1.0 (30.2)	−6.0 (21.2)	−7.5 (18.5)
Average precipitation mm (inches)	26.7 (1.05)	18.9 (0.74)	30.3 (1.19)	29.5 (1.16)	20.5 (0.81)	16.5 (0.65)	1.2 (0.05)	11.9 (0.47)	37.6 (1.48)	27.3 (1.07)	29.0 (1.14)	32.5 (1.28)	281.9 (11.09)
Average precipitation days (≥ 1 mm)	3.2	3.1	3.5	3.8	3.0	1.8	0.3	1.3	3.0	3.8	4.0	3.2	34
Average snowy days	0.1	0	0	0	0	0	0	0	0	0	0	0	0.1
Average relative humidity (%)	63	60	57	53	50	48	49	53	59	63	64	66	57
Mean monthly sunshine hours	198	198	229	261	310	342	366	326	249	226	192	180	3,077
Percentage possible sunshine	65	65	62	66	70	77	81	78	67	65	63	60	68
Source: Agencia Estatal de Meteorología

Climate data for Alcantarilla Base Area, 1991-2020 normals, 1940-present extremes, 75m
Month	Jan	Feb	Mar	Apr	May	Jun	Jul	Aug	Sep	Oct	Nov	Dec	Year
Record high °C (°F)	28.2 (82.8)	29.0 (84.2)	33.3 (91.9)	36.6 (97.9)	42.5 (108.5)	44.0 (111.2)	46.1 (115.0)	47.0 (116.6)	43.6 (110.5)	36.0 (96.8)	31.0 (87.8)	27.0 (80.6)	47.0 (116.6)
Mean daily maximum °C (°F)	16.8 (62.2)	18.2 (64.8)	21.0 (69.8)	23.5 (74.3)	27.1 (80.8)	31.5 (88.7)	34.4 (93.9)	34.5 (94.1)	30.4 (86.7)	25.9 (78.6)	20.3 (68.5)	17.1 (62.8)	25.1 (77.1)
Daily mean °C (°F)	10.5 (50.9)	11.8 (53.2)	14.2 (57.6)	16.6 (61.9)	20.2 (68.4)	24.4 (75.9)	27.4 (81.3)	27.7 (81.9)	24.1 (75.4)	19.7 (67.5)	14.4 (57.9)	11.2 (52.2)	18.5 (65.3)
Mean daily minimum °C (°F)	4.2 (39.6)	5.4 (41.7)	7.4 (45.3)	9.8 (49.6)	13.3 (55.9)	17.3 (63.1)	20.4 (68.7)	21.0 (69.8)	17.7 (63.9)	13.6 (56.5)	8.4 (47.1)	5.2 (41.4)	12.0 (53.6)
Record low °C (°F)	−5 (23)	−5 (23)	−4.2 (24.4)	−0.2 (31.6)	3.6 (38.5)	9.0 (48.2)	12.2 (54.0)	8.6 (47.5)	7.4 (45.3)	1.0 (33.8)	−2.6 (27.3)	−6 (21)	−6 (21)
Average precipitation mm (inches)	29.7 (1.17)	21.0 (0.83)	31.8 (1.25)	26.7 (1.05)	21.1 (0.83)	16.2 (0.64)	1.9 (0.07)	10.9 (0.43)	40.2 (1.58)	26.7 (1.05)	31.1 (1.22)	31.8 (1.25)	289.1 (11.37)
Average precipitation days (≥ 1.0 mm)	3.2	3.0	3.5	3.3	3.0	1.7	0.6	1.2	3.0	3.7	3.7	3.2	33.1
Average relative humidity (%)	64	60	57	53	49	46	48	51	58	63	65	67	57
Mean monthly sunshine hours	192	192	217	255	298	333	356	319	237	217	186	177	2,979
Percentage possible sunshine	63	63	59	65	68	76	79	76	64	62	61	59	66
Source: Agencia Estatal de Meteorología

== Demographics ==
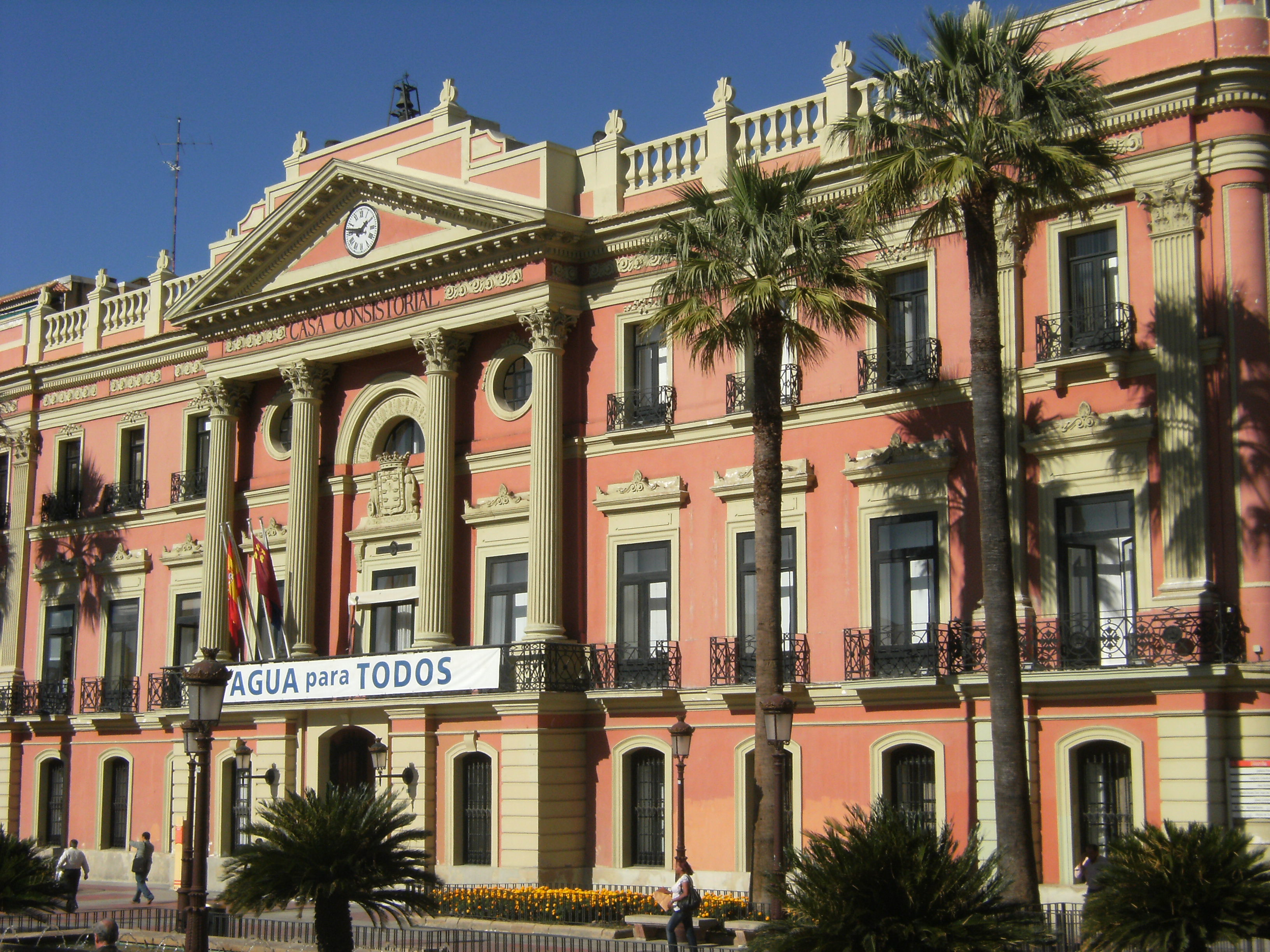
Murcia town hall

Foreign population by country of birth (2024)
Nationality	Population
Morocco	17,778
Ecuador	7,750
Colombia	7,081
Ukraine	5,146
Bolivia	3,946
Venezuela	3,320
Nicaragua	2,308
United Kingdom	2,257
France	2,133
Argentina	1,826
China	1,558
Romania	1,556
Algeria	1,501
Bulgaria	1,251
Cuba	982

Historical population
Year	Pop.	±%
1842	99,521	—
1857	89,314	−10.3%
1877	91,509	+2.5%
1887	98,507	+7.6%
1900	111,693	+13.4%
1910	125,243	+12.1%
1920	142,480	+13.8%
1930	159,825	+12.2%
1940	195,658	+22.4%
1950	217,934	+11.4%
1960	249,771	+14.6%
1970	243,687	−2.4%
1981	284,585	+16.8%
1991	328,100	+15.3%
2001	370,745	+13.0%
2011	437,667	+18.1%
2021	459,778	+5.1%
Source: INE

As of 2024, Murcia has 471,982 inhabitants making it the 7th-largest city in Spain. When adding in the municipalities of Alcantarilla, Alguazas, Beniel, Molina de Segura, Santomera, and Las Torres de Cotillas, the metropolitan area has 672,773 inhabitants making it the twelfth most populous metropolitan area in Spain as of 2020. Nevertheless, due to Murcia's large municipal territory, its population density (547 inhabitants/km^{2}, 760 hab./sq.mi.) does not likewise rank among Spain's highest.

As of 2024, the foreign-born population of the city is 76,853, equal to 16.3% of the total population, with 3.7% from the rest of Europe, 4.9% from Africa, 7.1% from the Americas and 0.6% from Asia.

Murcia is one of the communities with the largest Romani population in Spain.

== Main sights ==
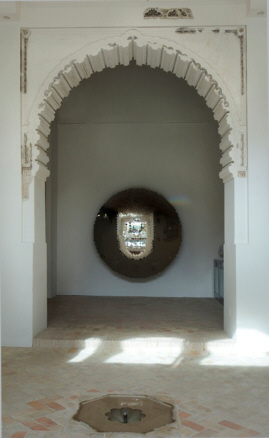
Arabic architecture of the Alcázar Seguir in Santa Clara Museum inside of Monasterio de Santa Clara la Real, constructed by Banu Hud in the 13th century.

The Cathedral of Murcia was built between 1394 and 1465 in the Castilian Gothic style. Its tower was completed in 1792 and shows a blend of architectural styles. The first two stories were built in the Renaissance style (1521–1546), while the third is Baroque. The bell pavilion exhibits both Rococo and Neoclassical influences. The main façade (1736–1754) is considered a masterpiece of the Spanish Baroque style.

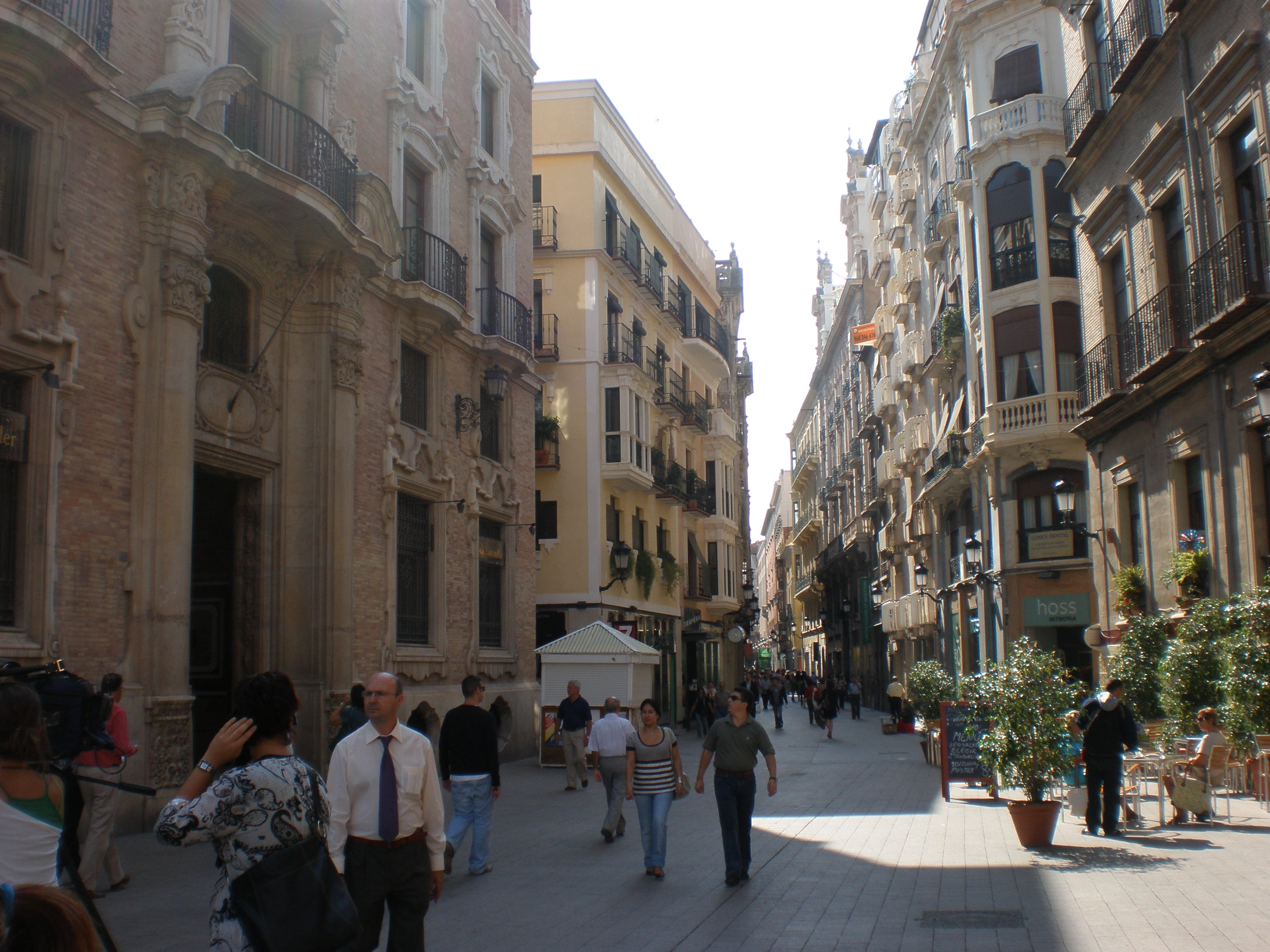
Trapería Street in the old town

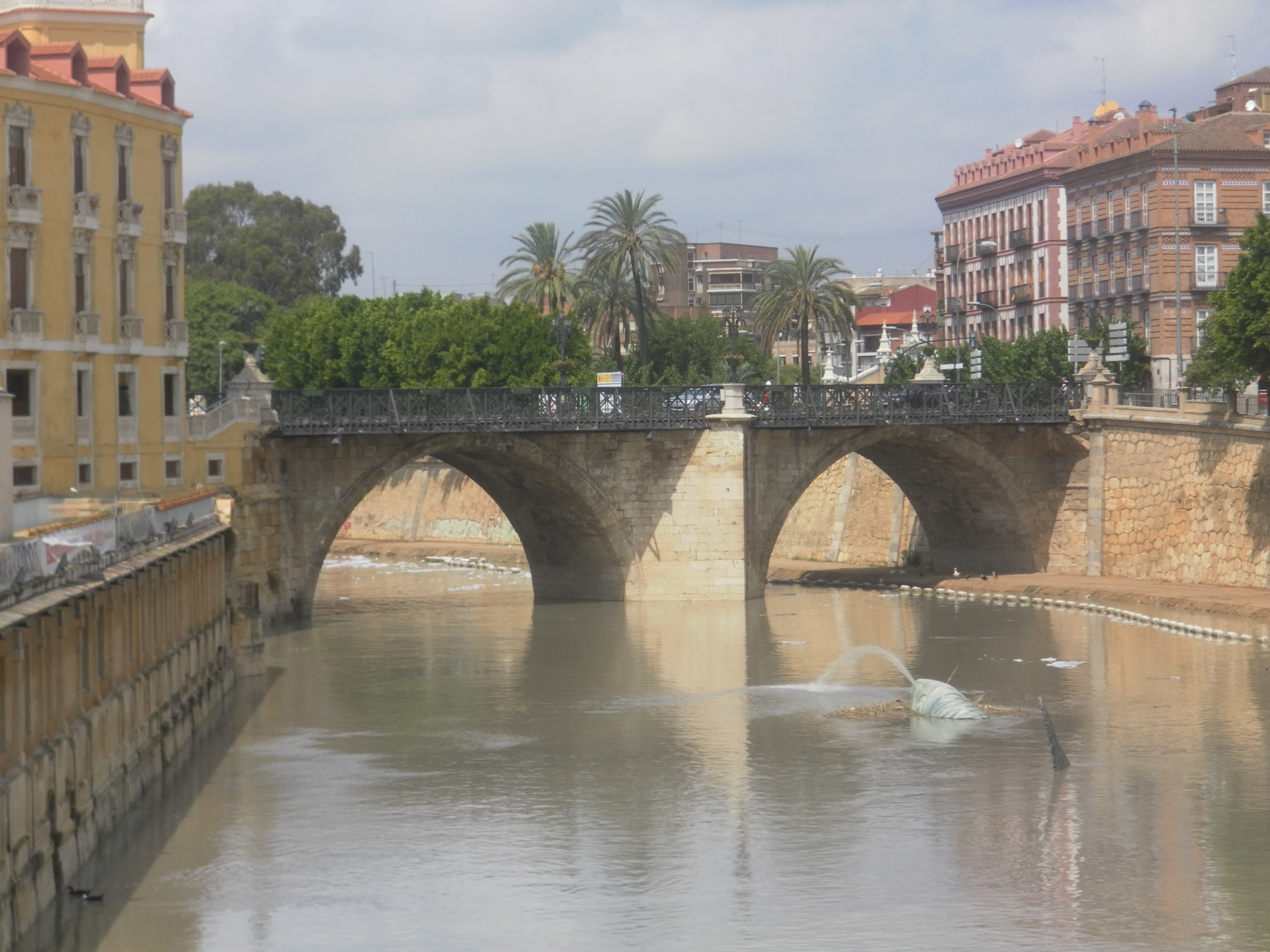
Murcia's oldest bridge, the Puente de los Peligros

Other buildings in the square shared by the cathedral (Plaza Cardinal Belluga) are the colorful 'Bishop's Palace' (18th century) and a controversial extension to the town hall by Rafael Moneo (built in 1999).

The Glorieta, which lies on the banks of the Segura River, has traditionally been the center of the town. It is a landscaped city square that was constructed during the 18th century. The ayuntamiento (city hall) of Murcia is located in this square.

Pedestrian areas cover most of the old town of the city, which is centered around Platería and Trapería Streets. Trapería goes from the cathedral to the Plaza de Santo Domingo, formerly a bustling market square. Located in Trapería is the Casino, a social club erected in 1847, with a sumptuous interior that includes a Moorish-style patio inspired by the royal chambers of the Alhambra near Granada. The name Platería refers to plata (silver), as this street was the historical focus for the commerce of rare metals by Murcia's Jewish community. The other street, Trapería, refers to trapos, or cloths, as this was once the focus for the Jewish community's garment trade.

Several bridges of different styles span the river Segura, from the Puente de los Peligros, an 18th-century stone bridge with a Lady chapel on one of its sides; to modern bridges designed by Santiago Calatrava or Javier Manterola; through others such as the Puente Nuevo (new bridge), an iron bridge of the early 20th century.

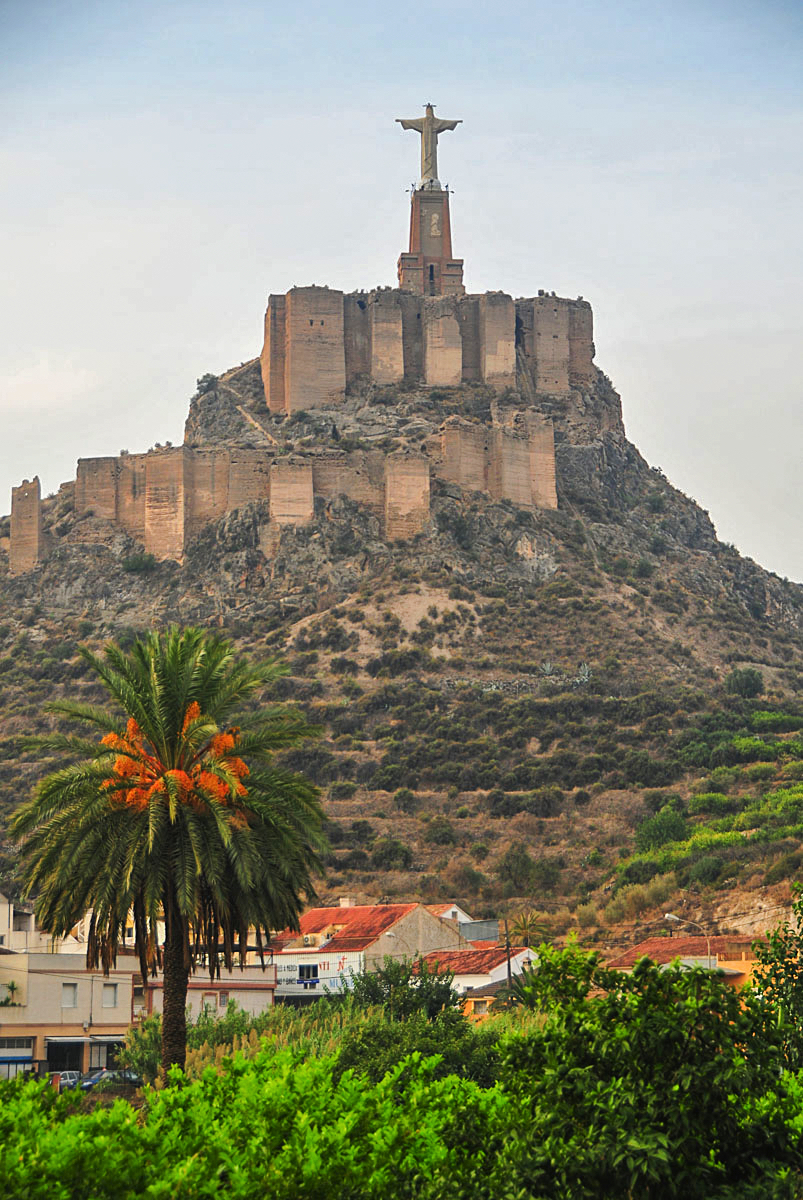
Castillo de Monteagudo

Other places around Murcia include:

- Santa Clara monastery, a Gothic and Baroque monument where a museum with the Moorish palace's remains from the 13th century is locared, called Alcázar Seguir.
- The Malecón boulevard, a former retaining wall for the Río Segura's floods.
- Santuario de Nuestra Señora de la Fuensanta, Algezares (1694), 17th century sanctuary and adjacent El Valle regional park: The construction began in 1694 and its architectural style is baroque with Murcian regional features.
- Los Jerónimos monastery (18th century). It was built during the first half of the century and is located in Guadalupe district, in the northwest quadrant of Murcia.
- Romea theatre (19th century). It was opened up by the queen Isabella II of Spain in 1862. Its façade has three bodies or levels.
- Circo theatre.
- Almudí Palace (17th century), art gallery in a historic building with coats of arms on its façade. On its interior there are Tuscan columns, and since 1985 it hosts the city archives and periodic art exhibitions.
- Monteagudo Castle (11th century): in the district with the same name, in the north of the municipality.
- Salzillo Museum, showcases the art of 18th-century baroque sculptor and Murcia native Francisco Salzillo.
- Centro Párraga, contemporary arts centre located in one of the pavilions of the old Artillery Headquarters of Murcia. It houses multiple exhibitions, performances and concerts throughout the year.
- Archaeological Museum of Murcia (MAM). It covers the rich Prehistory and History of Murcia, from the Palaeolithic to the Christian and Visigoth Period.
- San Juan de Dios church-museum, Baroque and Rococo circular church with the remains of the Moorish palace mosque from the 12th century in the basement, called Alcázar Nasir.

In the metropolitan area are also the Azud de la Contraparada reservoir and the Noria de La Ñora water wheel.

== Festivals ==
=== Holy Week ===
The Holy Week procession hosted by the city is among the most famous throughout Spain. This traditional festival portrays the events which lead up to and include the Crucifixion according to the New Testament. Life-sized, finely detailed sculptures by Francisco Salzillo (1707–1783) are removed from their museums and carried around the city in elegant processions amid flowers and, at night, candles, pausing at stations which are meant to re-enact the final moments before the crucifixion of Jesus. There is a small Jewish community of 127 members, mostly Spanish born but also Israeli, American and European born.They celebrate all Jewish holidays including Hannukah and Passover. These festivals are open to friends of Israel and businesses that buy and sell in Israel.

=== Easter fiestas ===
The most colorful festival in Murcia may come one week after Holy Week, when locals dress up in traditional huertano clothing to celebrate the Bando de la Huerta (Orchard parade) on Tuesday and fill the streets for The Burial of the Sardine in Murcia. parade the following Saturday. This whole week receives the name of Fiestas de Primavera de Murcia (Spring Fest).

=== Three Cultures International Festival ===
Murcia's Three Cultures International Festival happens each May and was first organised with the intent of overcoming racism and xenophobia in the culture. The festival seeks to foster understanding and reconciliation between the three cultures that have cohabited the peninsula for centuries, if not millennia: Christians, Jews and Muslims. Each year, the festival celebrates these three cultures through music, exhibitions, symposiums and conferences.

=== Festivities in the districts ===
Sundry festivities are held throughout the municipality and districts and patron saint festivities are included each part. Month where some occur are June and September. An activity that is slightly frequent in these festivities is the Coronación de las reinas, which usually consists in awarding the symbolic status of queens to three female children and three female teenagers. Holy Week festivities are also held in some districts on their own. Pasacalles (similar to standard parades) are also performed and so the desfiles de carrozas, which are parades in which floats play an important role. Religious activity includes processions (festive religious marches) in which there are statues of the Patron Virgin on a platform that is carried on the shoulders.

== Economy ==
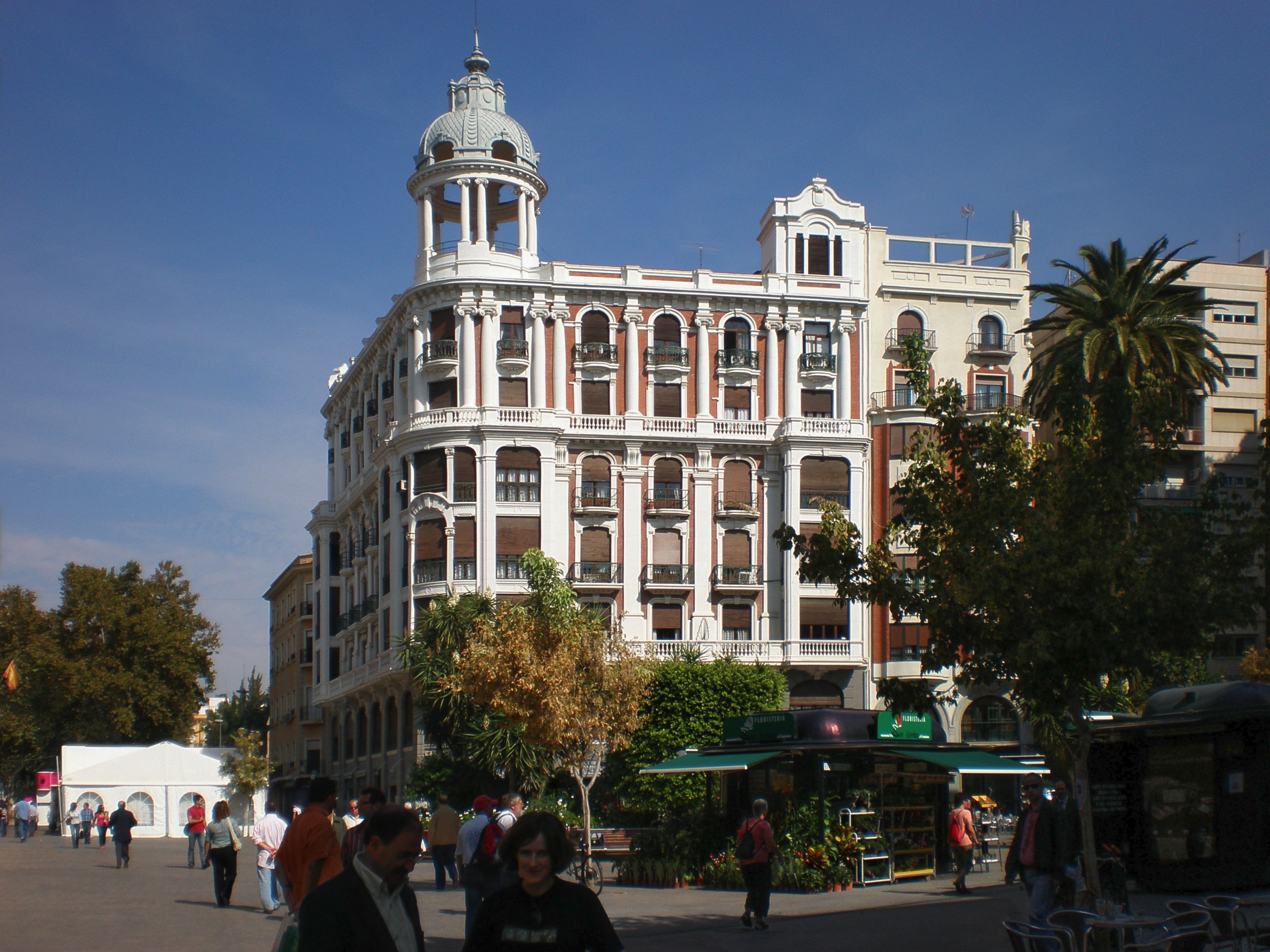
Casa Cerdá in Santo Domingo square

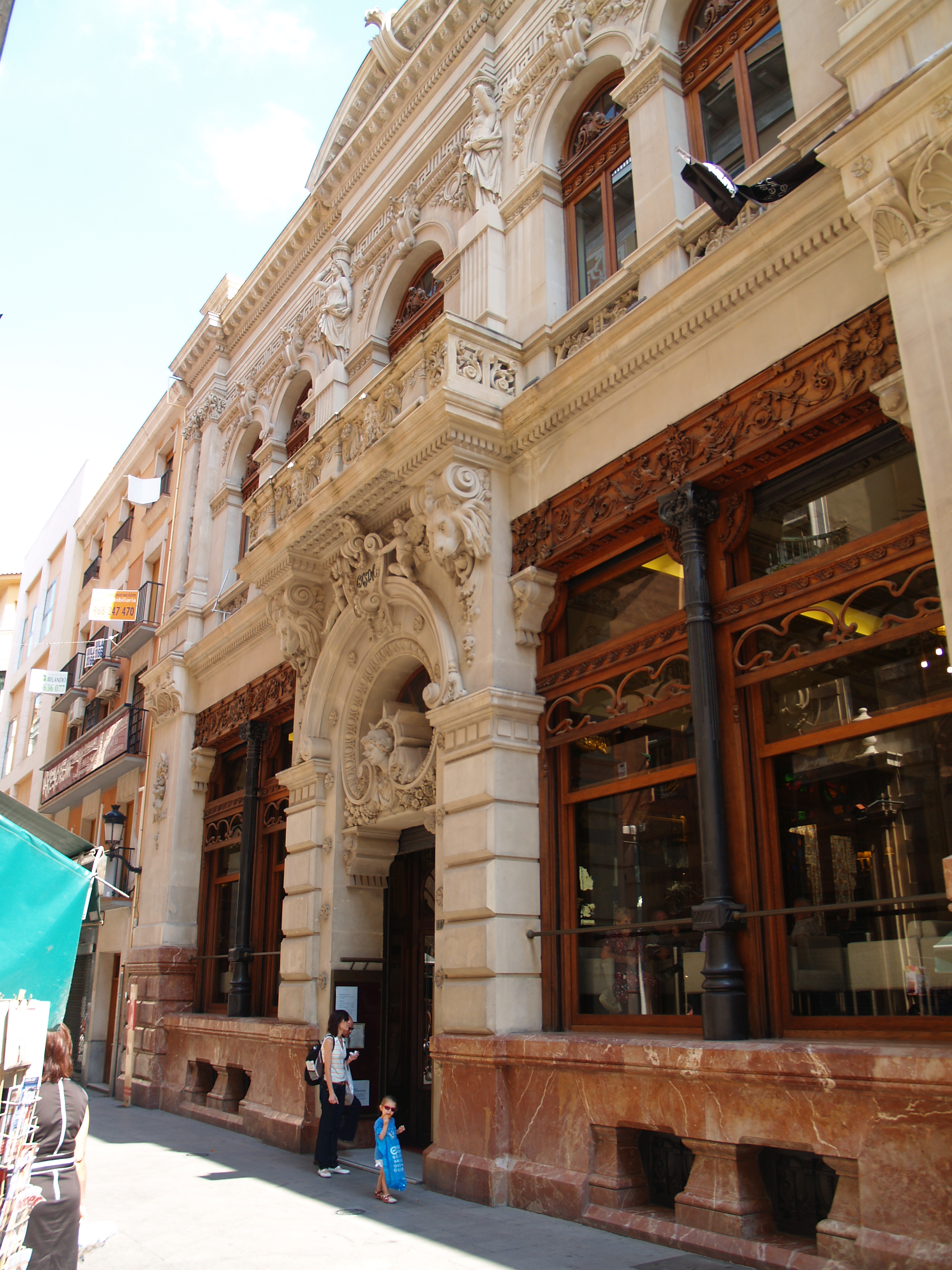
Casino of Murcia

Economically, Murcia predominantly acts as a centre for agriculture and tourism. 33.1% of the municipality is utilised with crops purposes. 35.3% of the agreements of 2019 were written for jobs in agriculture and fishing sectors and 9.84% workers had signed agreements for crop land labouring in the second half of 2016.

7.79% agreements corresponded to the industry sector in 2019 and 5.91% workers had signed agreements for industry labouring in the second half of 2016. 53.12% agreements corresponded to jobs of the service sector in 2019 and 14.26% workers had signed agreements for waiter jobs in the second half of 2016.

The economy of Murcia is supported by fairs and congresses, museums, theatres, cinema, music, aquariums, restaurants, hotels, shopping centres, campings, sports, foreign students, and tourism.

== Government ==
As generally in Spain, the governors are elected indirectly by voting for a political party in a day for municipal and autonomous community (the regions in Spain) elections every four years. The governors that are elected compose a government body named pleno, which has 30 members in Murcia. The alcalde (head governor in a municipality) chooses 10 members from the pleno in order to compose a governing cabinet named junta de gobierno, which has 10 members in Murcia. There are 7 partisans (including the alcalde) of Partido Popular party and 3 partisans of Ciudadanos in the junta de gobierno. The largest government body also includes 9 partisans of PSOE (Partido Socialista Obrero Español), 3 partisans of Vox and 2 partisans of Podemos and Equo.

Governing party
2003–2007	Partido Popular
2007–2011	Partido Popular
2011–2015	Partido Popular
2015–2019	Partido Popular
2019–2021	Partido Popular
2021–2023	Partido Socialista Obrero Español

== Transportation ==
Plaza Circular, located in the central area of the city. It is a critical hub for public transportation in the city.

=== Roads ===
A national highway named A-30, which connects Cartagena and Albacete, traverses the municipality from south to north, A national motorway named A-7 also occurs in Murcia, specifically in its northwest. There is also a highway named MU-30, which connects Alcantarilla municipality and El Palmar district, so it occurs in the northwestern quarter of Murcia. 52 regional pavement lines also occur in the municipality. The RM-1 road, which is intended to connect Santomera and San Javier, takes place in the east and the RM-15 highway, which connects Alcantarilla and Cehegín, occupies part of the northwest.

=== By plane ===
Region of Murcia International Airport (RMU) is located 20 km south from the city centre, in the suburban district of Corvera. The airport operates several international and domestic routes. It was opened on 15 January 2019. Alicante–Elche International Airport is located 60 km north-east from the city centre. This is 5th busiest airport in Spain with 15 million annual passengers.

=== By bus ===
Bus service is provided by two companies: Transportes de Murcia, an UTE (Joint Venture) formed by Ruiz, Marín & Fernanbús, who operates the urban lines, and Transporte de Murcia y Pedanías (TMP), who operates the interurban lines. Apart from the public transport, there is also a bus station located at the city center.

=== By tram ===
Tram of Murcia

The Murcia tram is managed by Tranvimur. As of 2024, 17.5 kilometres (11 miles) of line were available. Line 1 runs from the Espinardo Campus of the University of Murcia to the Estadio Nueva Condomina, with a central stop at Plaza Circular in the city center. An additional line, Line 1B, extends from the neighborhood of Espinardo to the Catholic University of Saint Anthony and the Los Jerónimos area.

=== By train ===
Train connections are provided by Renfe. Murcia has a railway station called Murcia del Carmen, located in the neighbourhood of the same name on the Chinchilla–Cartagena railway. Several long-distance lines link the city with Madrid, through Albacete, as well as Valencia, and Catalonia up to Montpellier in France. Murcia is also the center of a local network. The line C-1 connects the city to Alicante, and the line C-2 connects Murcia to Alcantarilla, Lorca and Águilas. It also has a regional line connecting it to Cartagena and a medium-range linea to Valencia and Zaragoza.

== Healthcare ==
The hospitals and other public primary healthcare centers belong to the Murcian Healthcare Service. There are three public hospitals in Murcia:

- Hospital Clínico Universitario Virgen de la Arrixacathat includes obstetrics and paediatrics units.
- Hospital General Universitario Reina Sofía: it is located in the main city, next to Segura river.
- Hospital Morales Meseguer: it is also placed in the main city.

Large part of the municipality belongs to the Health area I (Murcia/Oeste), which main place is the main town. Nevertheless, the districts that are located in the northeastern quarter are included in Health area VII (Murcia / Este) and the district Cabezo de Torres is included in Health area VI (Vega Media del Segura).

== Education ==
Murcia has three universities:

- two public universities: the University of Murcia, founded in 1272 and the Universidad Politécnica de Cartagena.
- one private university: the Catholic University Saint Anthony, founded in 1996.

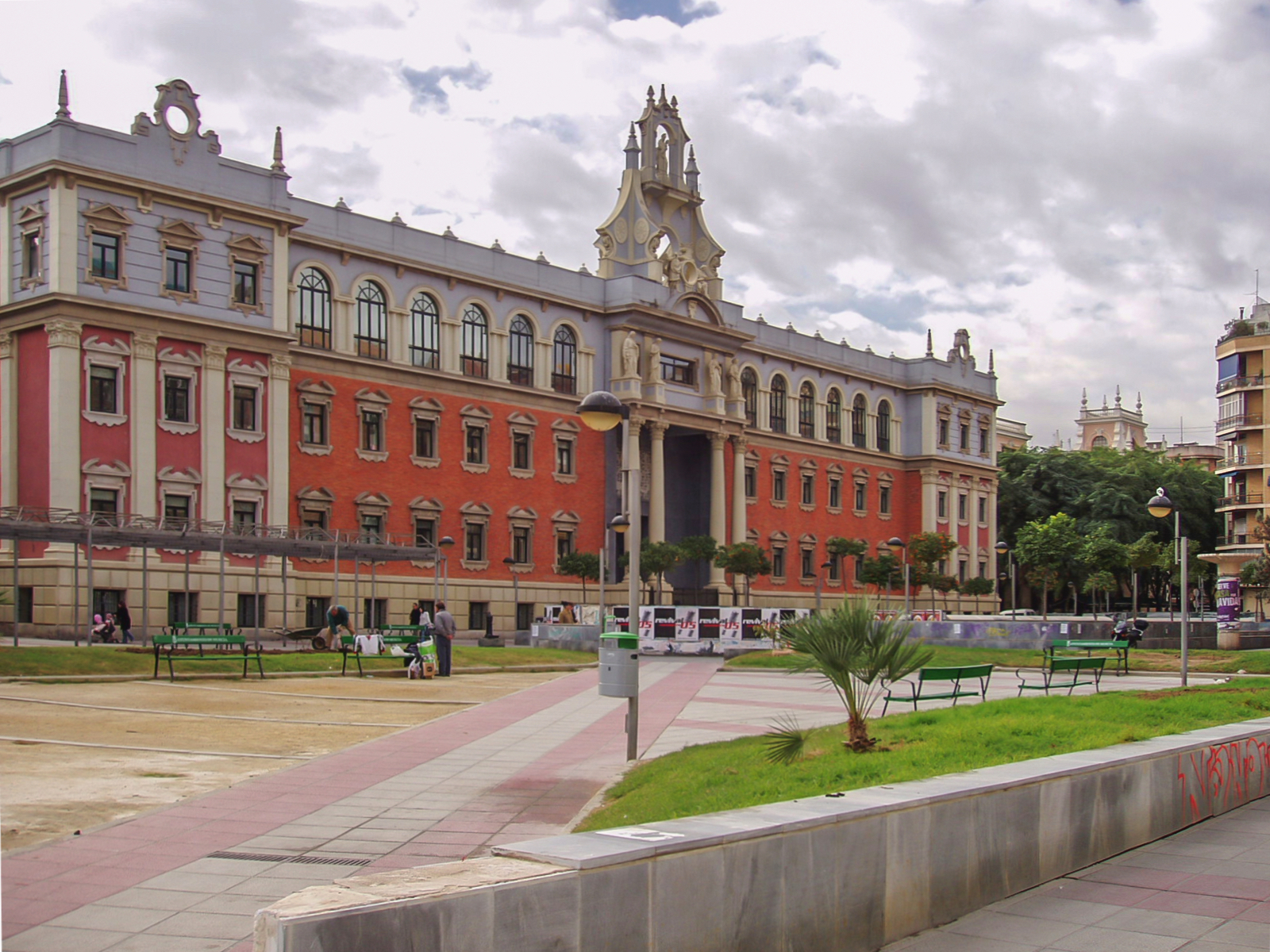
University of Murcia

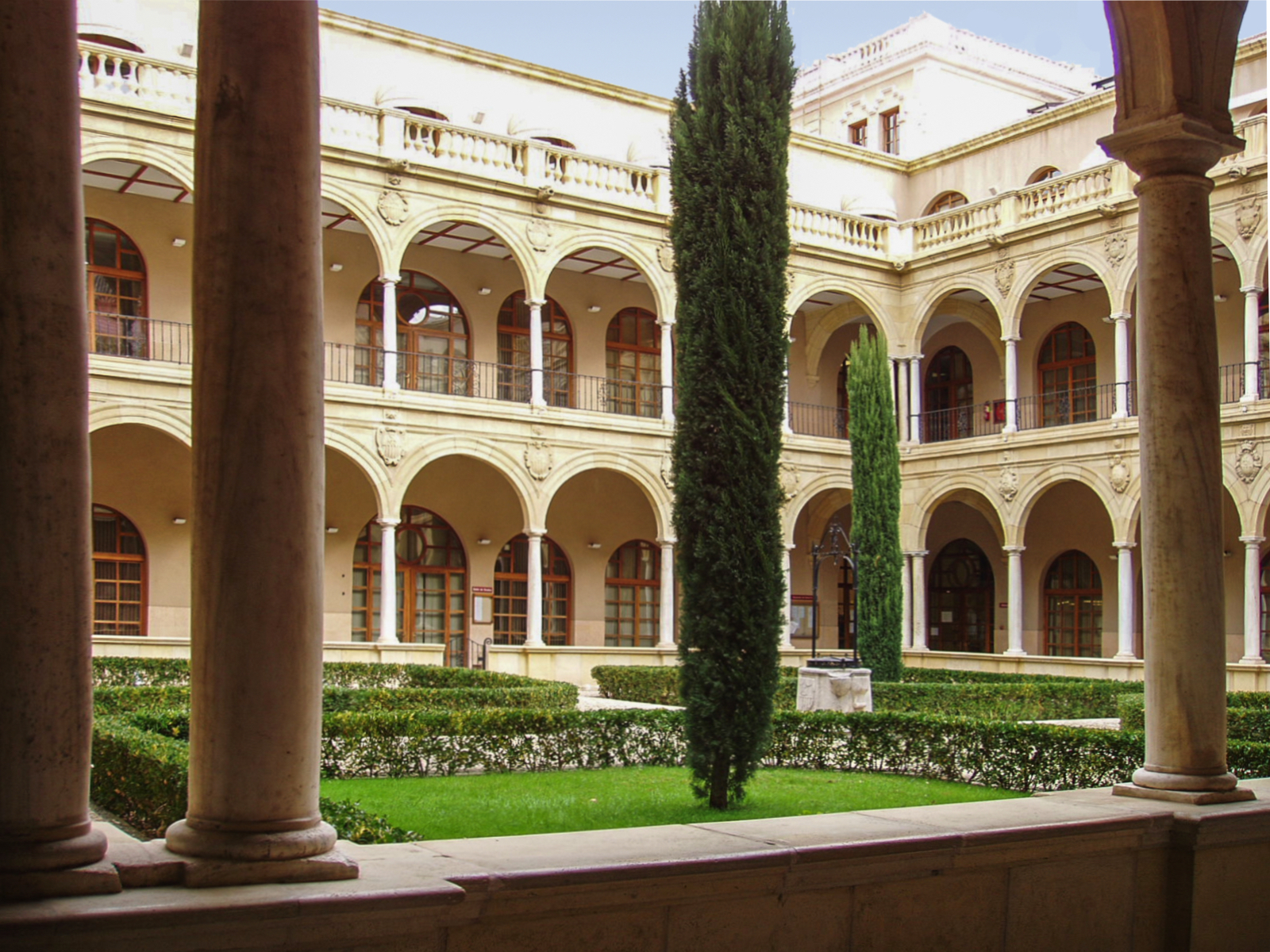
University of Murcia (cloister)

There are several high schools, elementary schools, and professional schools. Murcia has three types of schools for children: private schools such as El Limonar International School, Murcia (a British international school) and King's College, Madrid, The American School of Murcia (an American international school), semi-private schools (concertado), which are private schools that receive government funding and sometimes offer religious instruction, and public schools such as Colegio Publico (CP) San Pablo, IES Licenciado Francisco Cascales or the centenary CP Cierva Peñafiel, one of the oldest ones. The French international school, Lycée Français André Malraux de Murcie, is in nearby Molina de Segura.

The private schools and concertados can be religious (Catholic mostly but any religion is acceptable) or secular, but the public schools are strictly secular. Concertado or semi-private or quasi-private schools fill a need by providing schools where the government isn't able to or predate the national school system. The private schools in Murcia are not only English language schools. They also include Nelva, a religious school, and San Jorge, a secular bilingual Spanish school.

Murcia also offers Adult Education for people who want to return to complete high school and possibly continue on to the university.

== Notable people ==
- Pedro Acosta (2004–), MotoGP Rider
- Ibn al-Raqqam (1250-1315), astronomer, physician, mathematician and islamic scholar
- Jerónimo de Alcalá, (1571–1632), physician and author
- Fermín Aldeguer, (2005–), MotoGP Rider
- Muhyī al-Dīn Ibn al-'Arabī (1165–1240), Islam Sufi master and author, probably the most notable Sufi author of history with Al-Ghazali
- Nicolás Almagro (1985–), tennis player
- Carlos Alcaraz (2003–), tennis player
- Abul Abbas al-Mursi (1219–1286) Islam Sufi master
- Portu (1992–), professional football player
- Alberto Botía (1989–), professional football player
- Blas Cantó (1991–), singer
- Charo (1941–), musician, actress and entertainer
- Juan de la Cierva (1895–1936), inventor of the autogyro, a forerunner of the helicopter
- Luis Fajardo (c. 1556–1617), admiral and nobleman, conqueror of La Mamora
- Diego de Saavedra Fajardo (1584–1648), writer and diplomat
- Jorge Ruiz Flores (1975–), singer of Maldita Nerea Spanish band
- Ramón Gaya (1910–2005), painter and writer
- Xuso Jones (1989–), singer
- Ruth Lorenzo (1982–), singer
- Vicente Medina (1866–1937), poet and writer
- José Moñino, conde de Floridablanca (1728–1808), statesman, minister of King Charles III of Spain
- Francisco "Paco" Rabal (1926–2001), actor
- Francisco Salzillo (1707–1783), Baroque sculptor
- Francisco Sánchez Ruiz (1991-), professional pool player
- Ibn Sidah (c. 1007–1066), Arabic philologist and lexicographer
- Francisco Antonio Marín del Valle, Governor and Captain General of New Mexico between 1754 and 1760.
- Alejandro Valverde (1980–), cyclist
- Daniela Arques (2006–), professional football player

== Sports teams ==
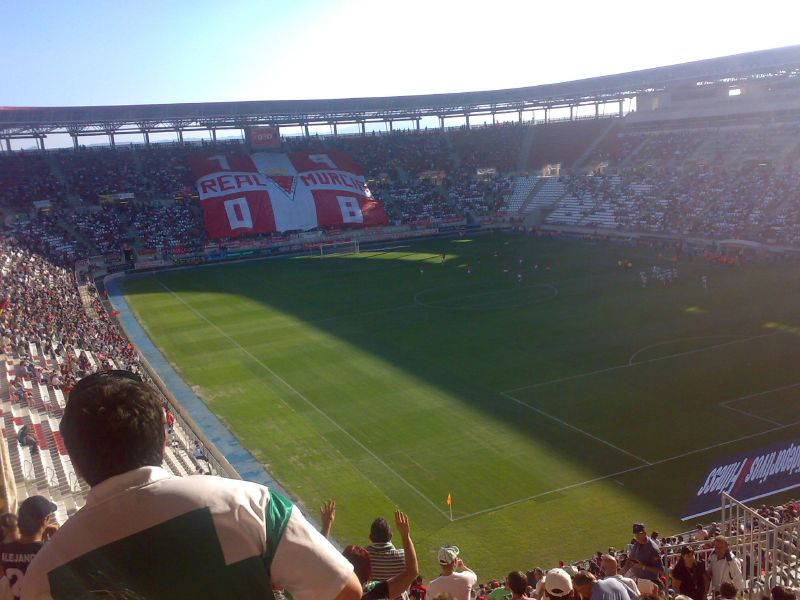
Estadio Nueva Condomina

Some of the sports teams of the municipality are listed below:

- Racing Murcia FC — a fifth-tier club
- Real Murcia – it was founded in 1908 and is a Primera Federación football team
- CF Atlético Ciudad – Spanish Third Division (Group 2) football (dissolved in 2010)
- UCAM Murcia – Segunda Federación football team
- CAP Ciudad de Murcia – Spanish Fourth Division (Group 13) football
- CB Murcia – the team is owned by the UCAM private university and it has been in the Spanish Liga ACB basketball league, which is the first division basketball league in the country.
- ElPozo Murcia Turística FS – a futsal team which was founded in 1992 and plays in the first division.
- Hispania Racing F1 Team – Formula One racing
- CAV Murcia 2005 – a volleyball team, and its name is an acronym for Club Atlético de Voleibol. It won the Supercopa de España tournament in the 2005–2006 season. The team was the winner in the Superliga Femenina de Voleibol in 2008. It won the Copa de la Reina Spanish tournament in 2011. It obtained 13 titles and ended in 2011 due to its debts.
- Origen (esports) – the most well-known League of Legends team in Spain and was founded in December 2014. It was a finalist team in the 2015 summer playoffs. The team has also been in the League of Legends Challenge Series and in the League of Legends Championship series. The team relocated from Murcia to in Denmark in 2018.

== Twin towns – sister cities ==
Murcia is twinned with:

- Santa Maria Capua Vetere, Italy (2026)
- Genoa, Italy (2018)
- Lecce, Italy (2002)
- Grasse, France (1990)
- Irapuato, Mexico (2012)
- Murcia, Philippines (2002)
- Łódź, Poland (1999)
- Miami, United States (1994)

== See also ==
- Kingdom of Murcia
- Christ of Monteagudo
- List of municipalities in the Region of Murcia
