= Puente de los Peligros =

Coordinates: 37.9828°N 1.13162°W

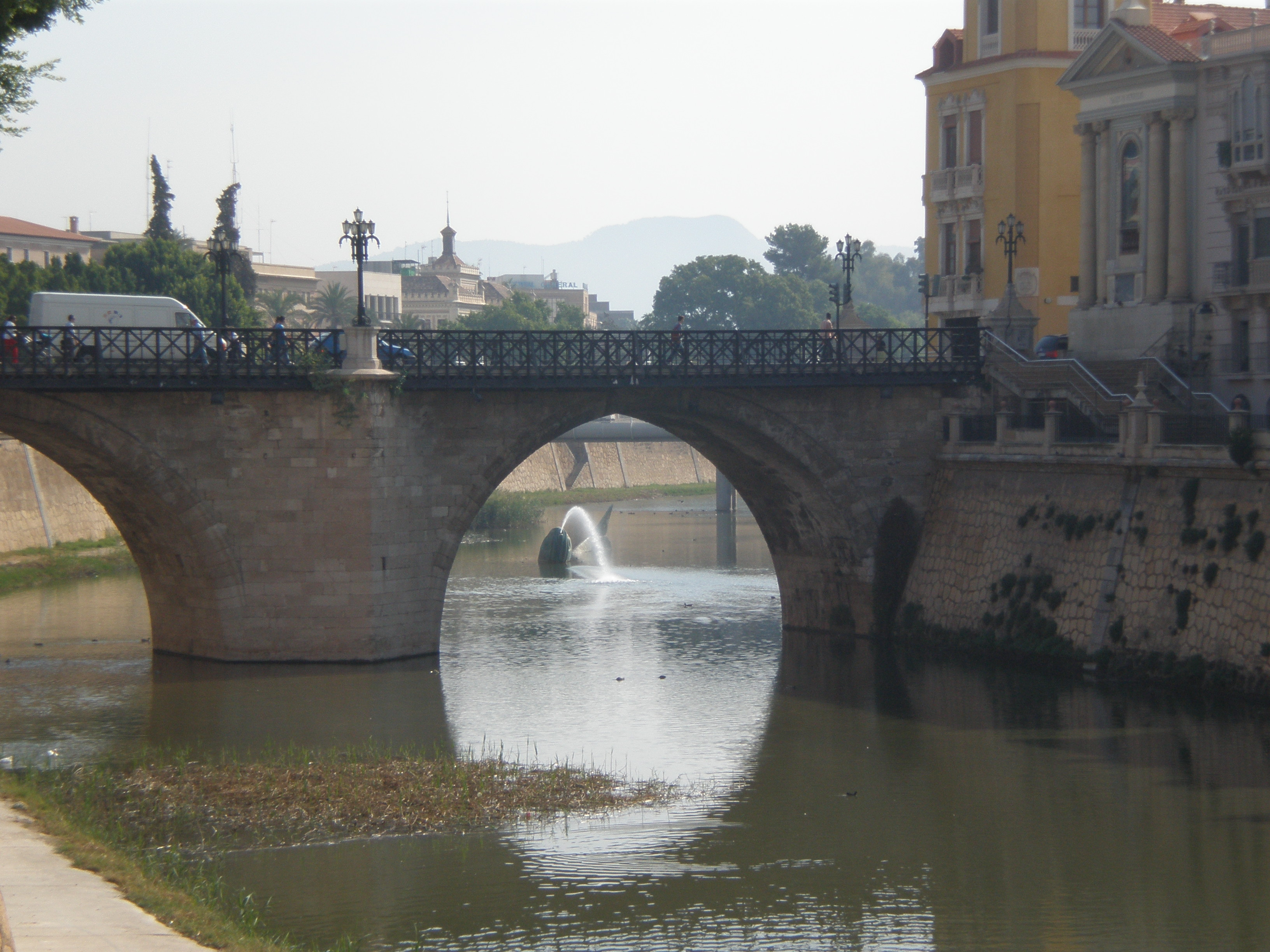
The bridge seen from upstream

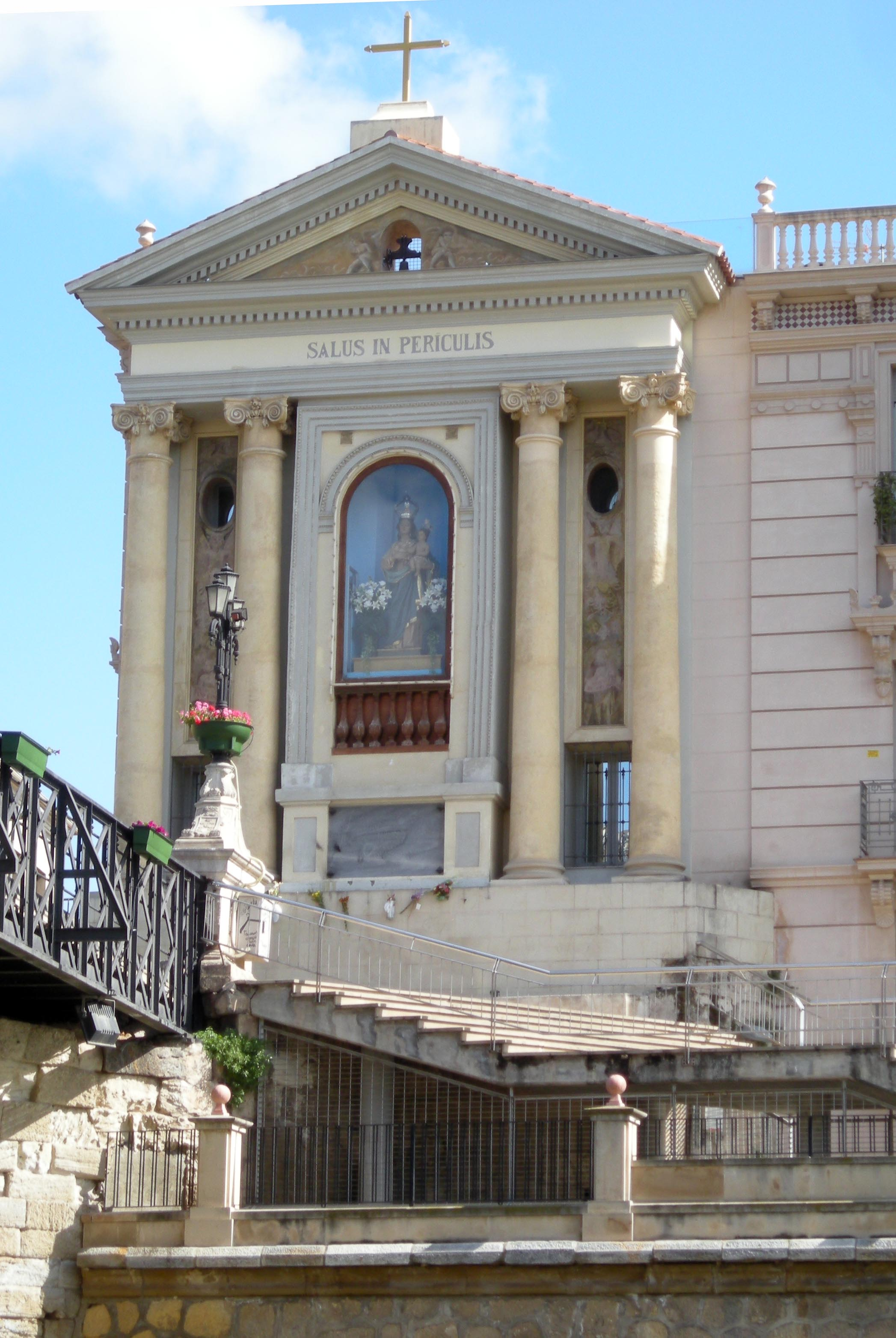
Niche of Nuestra Señora de los Peligros from which the bridge takes its name

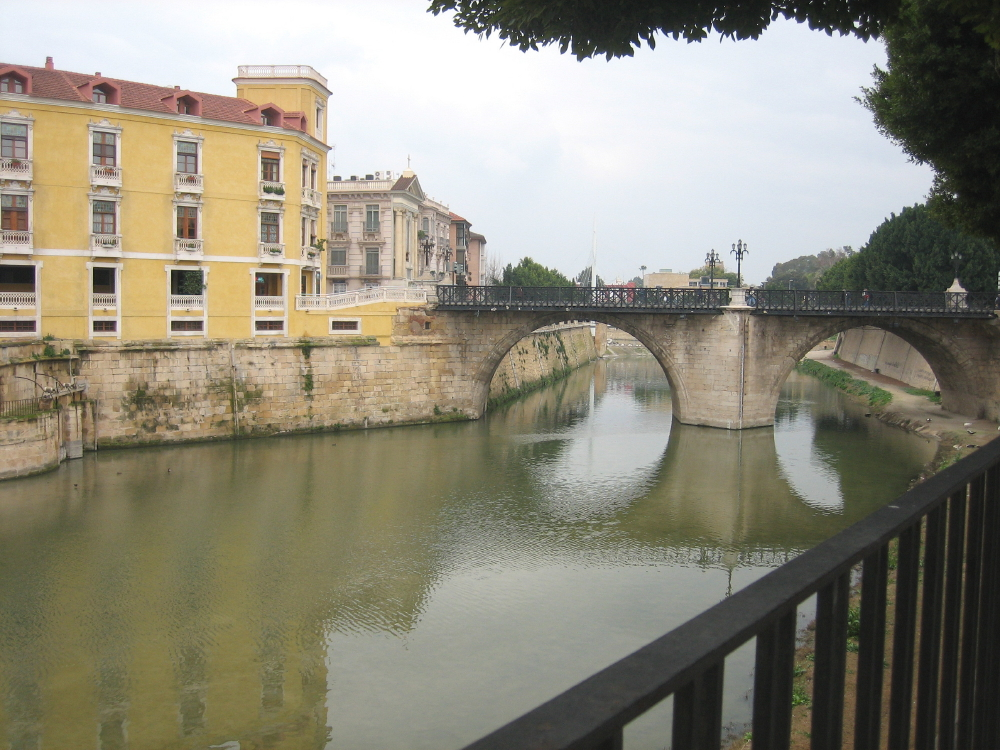
The bridge seen from downstream

The Puente de los Peligros (Spanish for bridge of the hazards) or also known as the Puente Viejo (Spanish for old bridge) is an arched stone bridge, completed in 1742, that spans the River Segura in the city of Murcia (Region of Murcia, Spain).

As this is the oldest bridge of the city, it is known as old bridge as opposed to the Puente Nuevo (Spanish for new bridge) built in 1903.

The popular name of Puente de los Peligros is due to the presence on the south side of the bridge of a niche that keeps a wooden statue of Nuestra Señora de los Peligros (Our Lady of Hazards), the work of Francisco Sánchez Araciel.

== History ==
On 26 September 1701, an extreme flood event destroyed the 16th-century bridge that used to link the city centre with the right bank of the river and the starting point of the royal road to Cartagena.

In 1717, after many delays and after Luis Salas y Sandoval was appointed Mayor of the city, the order to start the works was eventually given. In the same year Toribio Martínez de la Vega presented a description of the materials to be used, and a board of works to deal with the construction was commissioned.

In late April 1717, the wood which was to be used for the cofferdam and the scaffolding of the bridge began to be transported from the upper basin of the Segura, taking approximately six months to reach the city.

On 10 September 1718 the first stone of the bridge was laid, but soon after the works had to be stopped at the request of Philip V to the municipality of Murcia of 14,000 doubloons for the construction of the Royal Palace of La Granja de San Ildefonso.

Toribio Martínez de la Vega was at the forefront of the works for seven years building up the central pillar and the abutments. After some small progresses during the time in which Jerónimo Gómez de la Haya supervised the works, Jaime Bort was commissioned to direct the works. Bort continued to work according to the plans made by Martinez la Vega but he further widened the entrances to the bridge, especially on the right bank, Martinez de la Vega had done the same on the left, knocking down a part of the bridge gate of the city walls.

The construction, stalled again, resumed in 1739 and this time works would not stop until their completion in 1742. On 12 September 1742 a wooden statue of Our Lady of the hazards, from which the bridge is named after, was placed on the bridge. The neoclassical niche would be built on the right bank later on. Statues of Saint Michael and Saint Raphael, works of Joaquín Laguna, were also placed on the bridge starlings.

In 1850, the bridge was widened to make room for two sidewalks through a metal structure attached to the stalls. This meant the removal of the decorative elements placed on the starlings. This first extension was insufficient and in 1867 the bridge was further widened with a new metal structure, setting the layout of the bridge as it can be seen today.

The project was a success as it became the first permanent bridge in the history of Murcia that spanning the Segura could endure seamlessly the periodical river floods, including the great flood of Santa Teresa of 1879.

== Bibliography ==
- Estrella Sevilla, Emilio (2007), Dos siglos a la sombra de una torre, Murcia: Contraste Producciones, S.L., ISBN 978-84-612-0451-9
- Peña Velasco, Concepción de la (2001), El Puente Viejo de Murcia, Murcia: Universidad de Murcia, Servicio de Publicaciones, ISBN 84-8371-270-9

== External links (in Spanish) ==
- El Carmen en la página web del Ayuntamiento de Murcia.
- Historia del Barrio del Carmen en Región de Murcia Digital portal de información de la Comunidad Autónoma de la Región de Murcia.
