= LatBus =

Autobuses LAT
- Founded: 1982
- Commenced operation: 1982
- Ceased operation: December of 2021
- Headquarters: Avda. del Palmar, 619; 30120 El Palmar, Murcia; Spain; Spain
- Service type: Public transport

Autobuses LAT, S.L., known simply as LAT and before known as Latbus, is an enterprise from the Region of Murcia that operates private bus services, and until 2021, it was the operator of some regular services.

== History ==
It all began on the beginnings of the 20th century, when businessman's from the area started to set regular passenger lines that connected Murcia with its suburbs, which slowly were gaining ground to the tram that operated back then. On the decade of 1950, this services were regulated through concessions granted by the central government, with more than 20 different concessions.

On the decade of 1970, a process of concessions grouping began. From one side, the businessman Enrique Botas Blanco, who in 1996 was awarded the contract for urban transport of the city, took four of the concessions to the towns in the surrounding area of Murcia. On the other side, some merges between independent enterprises that operated on the same corridors happened. In 1971, Botas Blanco transferred the urban lines to Autobuses Urbanos de Murcia, S.A. (Aumusa), also of his property, and in 1976 he created the enterprise Lineas Regulares dek Sudeste, S.A. (Lirsa), which became the holder of his interurban concessions.

From 1980 onwards, the recently created regional council of Murcia adopted a merging and rationalisation on the transport services policy, thus promoting the unification of enterprises and concessions. Because of that, in 1981, ten enterprises merged to create Transportes de Viajeros de Murcia, S.A. (Travimusa), making that way two big groups dedicated to the public transport: Lirsa and Travimusa. That same year, Botas Blanco managed to get awarded again the urban buses through the enterprises Lirsa and Aumusa.

At the begins of 1982, Travimusa bought Lirsa and Aumusa with the support of the regional council. After that union, a joint mark was created, called LAT, using the first letter of the name of each enterprise: Lirsa, Aumusa and Travimusa. The scheme of colors was orange. Apart from that, a plan of coordination of lines was created to offer a better service for the user.

On the following years, Travimusa took over the concessions that were still held by other enterprises, making LAT reach all the points of the Huerta de Murcia and positioning as the main enterprise.

In 1999, the enterprise Busmar, S.A. joined LAT, so the name was renamed to Latbus and its color scheme was changed to white, orange and violet.

Between the end of 1999 and the begins of the year 2000, the concessions that were property of the four enterprises were readjusted. They started to have two autonomic concessions: MUR-092 between Murcia, the Valle de Ricote and the Mar Menor (Busmar) and MUR-092 for the metropolitan area of Murcia (Travimusa). Lirsa and Aumusa continued to be the urban service holders until August 2000, when the concession was transferred to Travimusa.

In 2012, the town hall of Murcia put out to tender the concession of urban buses which was awarded to the group of companies Transportes de Murcia, formed by the enterprises Martín, Ruiz and Fernanbus. Because of that, LAT started to only have the autonomic concessions after 30 years of operating the urban lines.

In 2015 the enterprise decided to go back to the original name (LAT) and they changed the complete color scheme to yellow.

In December 2021, the enterprise stopped operating regular services due to that the two concessions it had expired and not having submitted to the new regional competitions.

== Concessions ==
The enterprise owned two concessions of autonomic holder, which administration competed to the Dirección General de Movilidad y Litoral de la Consejería de Fomento e Infraestructuras:

- MUR-092: Valle de Ricote - Murcia - Playas del Mar Menor y Mayor (Busmar, S.L.)
- MUR-093: Murcia y Cercanías (Transportes de Viajeros de Murcia, S.L.U.)

The principal concession was the MUR-093, which connected Murcia with 43 of their districts and with the municipalities of the metropolitan area (Alcantarilla, Molina de Segura, Santomera, Beniel, Las Torres de Cotillas, Alguazas, Ceutí and Lorquí) as well as the neighborhoods of Espinardo, La Purísima-Barriomar and San Pío X.

On the other side, the MUR-092 concession connected Murcia with the districts of the Campo de Cartagena and other populations of the area, with the municipalities of the Valle de Ricote, of the north coast of the Mar Menor and the south of the province of Alicante.

The origins of both concessions go back to 1999 for MUR-092 and 2000 for MUR-092. They were created like links of the concessions that were before part of Lirsa, Travimusa and Busmar.

With this situation, the autonomous community was the administrator of the transports that were made inside of the municipality of Murcia, even thought the law 10/2015 said that the administration should belong to the town hall of Murcia. The transfer to the municipal administration was planned to be done in December 2019. However, due to that the new autonomic concession map and the new network of municipal city, the transfer happened in December 2021. The new service began on December 3, 2021, under the brand TMP Murcia, due to that LAT lost the contract for the public transport, which was given to Monbus, ending that way the 30 years of operation of LAT in Murcia.

On the other side, the Consejería de Fomento e Infraestructuras decided to renew the network of lines at regional level, under the new brand Movibus. To do that, they divided the metropolitan area of Murcia in three new concessions which were awarded to the enterprises ALSA, Interbus and Orbitalia. The concession MUR-092 was transferred to the Grupo Interbus, who continued operating the three interurban lines.

Until October 2012 it was also owner of the Murcia urban lines concession. Because of this, the interurban lines were structured so that they also would serve urban service. This caused some problems between LAT and the new concession owner Transportes de Murcia, due to that some areas had a duplicated scheme.

== Lines ==
This are the following lines that the enterprise operated until December 2021:

=== Concession MUR-092: Valle de Ricote - Murcia - Playas del Mar Menor y Mayor ===
| Line | Route | |
|---|---|---|
| 42 | Blanca Ricote Ulea | Villanueva del Río Segura - Archena - Lorquí - Molina de Segura - Espinardo - Murcia (bus station) |
| 70 | Campoamor - Torre de la Horadada - Pilar de la Horadada - San Pedro del Pinatar - Santiago de la Ribera - San Javier - Balsicas - El Palmar - Murcia (bus station) Avileses - Sucina - Gea y Truyols - Baños y Mendigo - El Palmar - Murcia (Jardín Floridablanca) | |
| 72 | Cartagena - El Albujón - Lobosillo - Balsapintada Fuente Álamo de Murcia | Valladolises - Corvera - Baños y Mendigo - El Palmar - Murcia (bus station) |

=== Concession MUR-093: Murcia y Cercanías ===
| Line | Route | | |
|---|---|---|---|
| 1 | Pol. Ind. Oeste - San Ginés - Era Alta - Murcia - Estadio Nueva Condomina | | |
| 6 | La Alberca - Ctra. Santa Catalina - Murcia (Sta. Mª de Gracia) | | |
| 7 | La Albatalía - Murcia - La Arboleja | | |
| 21 | Ceutí | Lorquí Alguazas | Molina de Segura - Espinardo - Murcia (bus station) |
| 22 | Molina de Segura - Murcia (Avda. Primo de Rivera) | | |
| 26 | Hospital Virgen de la Arrixaca - El Palmar - Aljucer - Murcia (bus station) San José de la Montaña - El Palmar - San Ginés - Aljucer - Murcia (Glorieta de España) | | |
| 28 | Sangonera la Verde - El Palmar - Aljucer - Murcia (Palacio Almudí) | | |
| 29 | La Alberca - Santo Ángel - Patiño - Murcia (El Ranero) | | |
| 30 | El Mojón - Zeneta Cabezo de la Plata | Los Ramos - Torreagüera - Beniaján - Los Dolores - Murcia (Plaza Circular) | |
| 31 | Beniel - El Raal Alquerías | Santa Cruz - Llano de Brujas - Puente Tocinos - Murcia - C.C. El Tiro | |
| 32 | El Raal - Santa Cruz - Llano de Brujas - Puente Tocinos - Murcia - Puente Tocinos - Llano de Brujas - Santa Cruz - El Raal | | |
| 36 | El Siscar - Santomera - Cobatillas - El Esparragal - Monteagudo - Murcia (bus station) | | |
| 37 | El Bojar - Beniaján - San José de la Vega | Camino de Tiñosa Camino de los Pinos | Los Dolores - Murcia (Plaza Cruz Roja) |
| 39 | Campus de Espinardo - Espinardo - Murcia (train station) Campus de Espinardo - Murcia (Infante) express | | |
| 41 | Murcia (bus station) - Alcantarilla - Javalí Nuevo - Las Torres de Cotillas - Alguazas - Molina de Segura - Espinardo - Murcia (bus station) (and vice versa) | | |
| 44 | Sangonera la Seca - Alcantarilla - Murcia - Espinardo | | Guadalupe - UCAM - La Ñora El Puntal - Urb. La Ladera Cemetery |
| 47 | Molina de Segura - Campus de Espinardo - UCAM | | |
| 49 | Molina de Segura - Urb. Los Conejos - Urb. La Alcayna - Murcia (Jardín Floridablanca) | | |
| 50 | San José de la Vega - Los Garres Santuario de la Fuensanta | | Algezares - Barrio del Progreso - Murcia - Churra - Cabezo de Torres |
| 51 | Ribera de Molina - Torrealta - Molina de Segura | | El Llano de Molina Urbanization's |
| 52 | Urb. Altorreal - Murcia (Plaza Circular) | | |
| 62 | Rincón de Seca - Murcia - Zarandona - Casillas - Orilla del Azarbe | | |
| 78 | Beniaján - Los Garres - Algezares - Santo Ángel - La Alberca - El Palmar - San Ginés - Era Alta - Alcantarilla - Javalí Nuevo - UCAM - Campus de Espinardo | | |
| 79 | Molina de Segura - Torrealta - Ribera de Molina - Javalí Viejo - La Ñora - Rincón de Beniscornia - La Albatalía - Murcia (Plaza Circular) | | |
| 91 | Sangonera la Seca - Javalí Nuevo - Puebla de Soto - La Raya - Murcia (Plaza Circular) | | |

Until 2012 more lines existed, however, they were removed or merged with another lines after a line reordering.

==== Night lines (Buhobús) ====
| Line | Route |
|---|---|
| 11 | Sangonera la Verde - El Palmar - La Alberca - Santo Ángel - Patiño - Murcia (Atalayas) |
| 12 | Zeneta - Los Ramos - Torreagüera - Beniaján - San José de la Vega - Los Garres - Algezares - Barrio del Progreso - Murcia (Atalayas) |
| 13 | Rincón de Beniscornia - La Ñora - Guadalupe - Espinardo - El Puntal - Churra - Cabezo de Torres - Murcia (Atalayas) |
| 14 | Sangonera la Seca - Javalí Nuevo - Alcantarilla - Puebla de Soto - La Raya - Nonduermas - Era Alta - San Ginés - Aljucer - Murcia (Atalayas) |
| 15 | Alquerías - Beniel - El Raal - Santa Cruz - Llano de Brujas - Puente Tocinos - Murcia (Plaza Circular) |
| 16 | Cobatillas - El Campillo - El Esparragal - Las Lumbreras - Monteagudo - La Cueva - Casillas - Zarandona - Murcia (Plaza Circular) |

In 2005, a night bus service was created through a municipal concession. The concession was later removed and the enterprise had to operate the service without any help from the administrations.

The service was removed on 20 January 2017 due to a strike convened by the trade unions due to the low security that the drivers had. On 21 December 2018, the service was re-added with a new line, that connected Cobatillas with Murcia.

Before this line was introduced, the numeration that the lines followed was from 55 to 59, following the lines order.

Apart from the night lines, the lines 49 and 52 also had night services that departed from Murcia on Friday and Saturday nights.

Due to the COVID-19 pandemic, in March 2020 the night services were removed, and they never were added back.

Apart from this lines, there were also 3 lines that connected the municipalities of Santomera, Alcantarilla and Las Torres de Cotillas.

== Fees ==
This are the following fees that were effective until December 2021:

| Ticket | Price | Description |
|---|---|---|
| Single ticket | €1.05 | Journeys made inside of the Murcia urban area |
| Single ticket | €1.85 | Journeys between the Murcia urban area and the rest of the Murcia municipality and between populations of the Murcia municipality. |
| Single ticket | €2.05 | Journeys made between the municipality of Murcia and the municipalities of Alcantarilla, Santomera, Las Torres de Cotillas, Alguazas and Molina de Segura. |
| Single ticket | From €1.15 to €5.20 | Journeys made on the lines 42, 70 and 72 (price according to the line and journey) |
| Bono Murcia | €0.70/journey | Card valid for TMurcia, LAT and tram in the municipality of Murcia |
| Bono Murcia Student | €0.50/journey | Card valid for TMurcia, LAT and tram in the municipality of Murcia |
| Bono Murcia General Large Family | €0.50/journey | Card valid for TMurcia, LAT and tram in the municipality of Murcia |
| Bono Murcia Special Large Family | €0/journey | Valid for TMurcia, LAT and tram in the municipality of Murcia |
| Bono Murcia Retirees and Pensioners | €0/journey | Valid for TMurcia, LAT and tram in the municipality of Murcia |
| Unibono Estudiante | €22 | Unlimited journeys in 30 days, valid for TMurcia, LAT and tram in the municipality of Murcia |
| General Transfer Voucher | €15 | 13 journeys inside of the municipality of Murcia |
| General Transfer Voucher 2 | €7 | 6 journeys inside of the municipality of Murcia |
| General Metropolitan Voucher | €15 | 11 journeys inside of the municipality of Murcia |
| General Metropolitan Voucher 2 | €7 | 5 journeys inside of the municipality of Murcia |
| Student Metropolitan Voucher | €17 | 15 journeys inside of the municipality of Murcia |
| Student Metropolitan Voucher 2 | €8 | 7 journeys inside of the municipality of Murcia |
| Student Transfer Voucher | €11 | 13 journeys inside of the municipality of Murcia |
| Student Transfer Voucher 2 | €6 | 7 journeys inside of the municipality of Murcia |

There were also specific vouchers for each line, as well as valid vouchers for certain municipalities that had a contract with the company.

== Fleet ==
At the begins of the 20th century, the fleet was mostly composed by Mercedes-Benz O 405 Hispano VOV buses.

Subsequently, the Hispano Habit buses were introduced, passing to be most of the fleet.

From the modernization of the year 2015, new vehicles such as the Sunsundegui Astral, the Castrosua Magnus and the Iveco Crossway were added. Most of this buses were second-handed from Madrid concessionaires.

Below is the list with some of the models that the enterprise has had along their history:

- Mercedes-Benz O 405 Hispano VOV
- Vanhool A300
- Vanhool AG700
- Mercedes-Benz Citaro
- Carsa CS40 City
- Hispano Habit
- Noge Touring Intercity
- Mercedes-Benz Integro
- Sunsundegui Astral
- Castrosua Magnus
- Iveco Crossway

When LAT stopped serving regular services, they had a fleet of 130 vehicles.

== Bus depot ==
Until the year 2008 the bus depot was located at the Carril de la Condesa, in Murcia.

That same year, the new bus depot at the Carretera del Palmar was inaugurated.

In 2021, due to the change of the concessionaire enterprise, the new enterprise Monbus started using this bus depot.
