= Districts of Murcia =

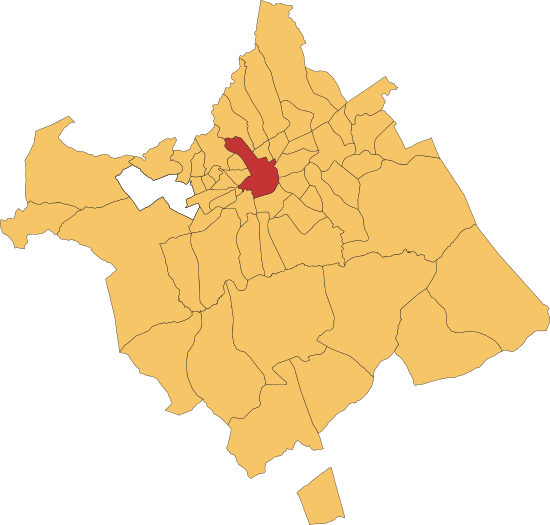
Demarcation of the districts and the main town highlighted

This article lists the districts of Murcia in Spain. Murcia has 54 districts, which are named pedanías.

== La Albatalía ==
This district is placed in the northwestern quarter of Murcia and has a surface of 1.92 km^{2}. It is adjacent to the main town, La Arboleja and Guadalupe. There were 2,040 inhabitants in 2019.

== La Alberca ==
It covers 10.275 km^{2} and shares borders with Aljucer, Santo Ángel, Baños y Mendigo and El Palmar. 12,755 people resided there in 2019.

== Algezares ==
This district adjoins Garres y Lages, Beniaján, Gea y Truyols, Baños y Mendigo, Santo Ángel and San Benito - Patiño. It has an area of 24.74 km^{2}An important building of Murcia is located in this territory and it is Nuestra Señora de la Fuensanta Sanctuary.

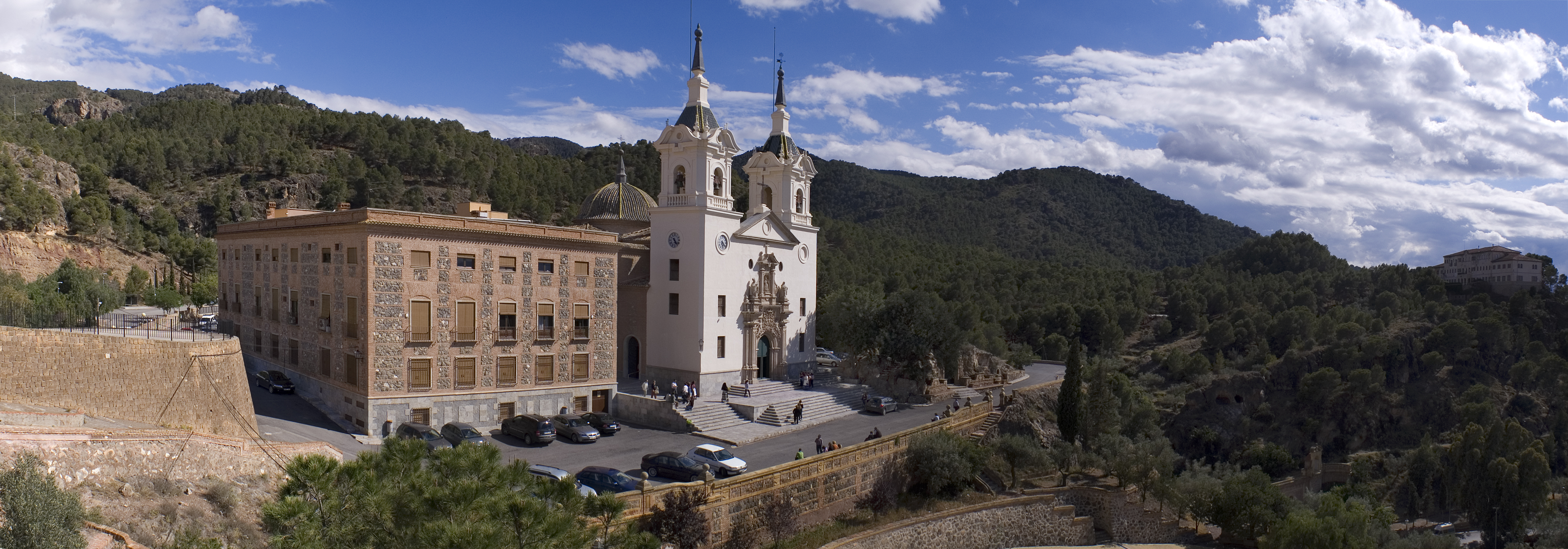
Fuensanta Sanctuary

== Aljucer ==
This territory is located in the northern half of Murcia. Its surface consists of 4.181 km^{2}. It is adjacent to the main city, San Benito - Patiño, La Alberca, El Palmar, San Ginés and Era Alta.

== Alquerías ==
It occurs in the northeastern quarter of Murcia and covers an area of 7.87 km^{2}. It is adjacent to El Raal, Beniel municipality, Zeneta, Los Ramos and Santa Cruz.

== La Arboleja ==
This territory is placed in the northern half of the municipality. Its surface consists of 1.624 km^{2}. It adjoins La Albatalía, the main city, Rincón de Seca and Rincón de Beniscornia.

== Baños y Mendigo ==
This district occurs in the southern half of Murcia. It has an area of 58.725 km^{2}. It shares borders with Santo Ángel, Algezares, Gea y Truyols, Los Martínez del Puerto, Valladolises, Corvera and El Palmar.

== Barqueros ==
It is placed in the west end of the municipality and is the place that is the most in the west in Murcia. Its surface consists of 19.75 km^{2}. It adjoins to Cañada Hermosa, Sangonera la Seca, Librilla municipality and Mula municipality.

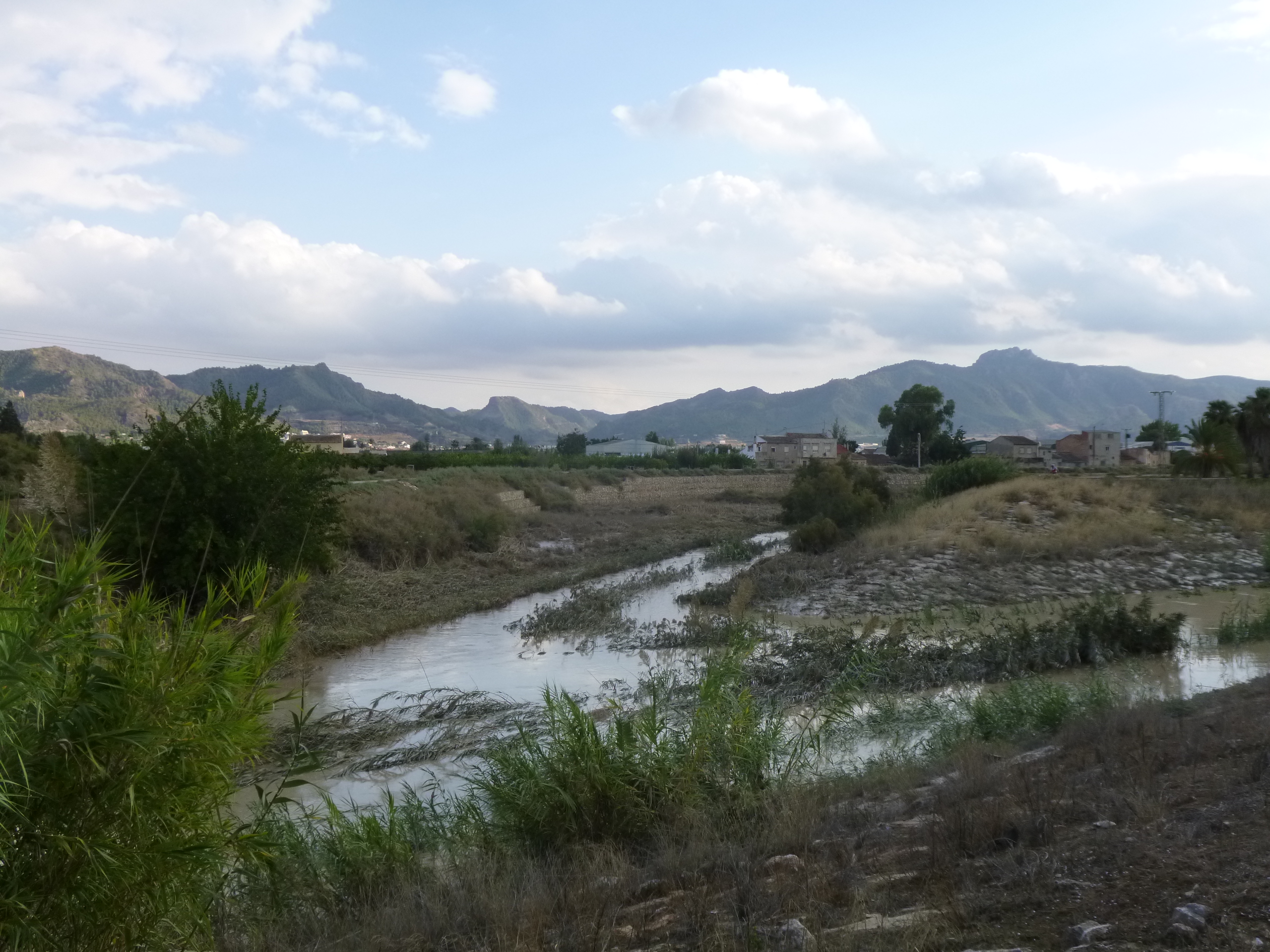
The mouth of Guadalentín tributary and Segura River in Beniaján

== Beniaján ==
It occurs in the southwest of the northeastern quarter of Murcia and covers an area of 13.924 km^{2}. The district is adjacent to Llano de Brujas, Torreagüera, Cañadas de San Pedro, Algezares, Garres y Lages, San José de la Vega, Los Dolores and Puente Tocinos.

== Cabezo de Torres ==
This district is placed in the north of the municipality and covers 14.375 km^{2}. It adjoins Molina de Segura, El Esparragal, Monteagudo, Zaradona, Santiago y Zaraiche and Churra.

== Cañada Hermosa ==
This territory is located in the northwest end of Murcia and covers 44.135 km^{2}. It shares borders with Las Torres de Cotillas municipality, Javalí Nuevo, Alcantarilla municipality, Sangonera la Seca, Barqueros, Mula municipality and Campos del Río municipality. It had a population of 107 in 2019.

== Cañadas de San Pedro ==
It occurs in the east end of the municipality and has a surface of 66.093 km^{2}. The district adjoins Sucina, Gea y Truyols, Algezares, Beniaján, Torreagüera, Los Ramos, Zeneta and Orihuela municipality. 337 people resided in the territory in 2019.

== Carrascoy ==
The district is located in the southwest end of Murcia. Its area consists in 30.325 km^{2}. It is adjacent to Sangonera la Seca, Sangonera la Verde, Corvera and Fuente Álamo de Murcia municipality.

== Casillas ==
It is located in the northeastern quarter of Murcia and covers an area of 2.488 km^{2}. It shares borders with Monteagudo, Llano de Brujas, Puente Tocinos and Zarandona.

== Churra ==
This territory occurs in the north of the municipality. Its surface consists in 5.6 km^{2}. It adjoins Cabezo de Torres, Santiago y Zaraiche, Murcia and El Puntal.

== Cobatillas ==
This territory is placed in the northeastern of Murcia and has an area of 5.98 km^{2}. It is adjacent to Santomera municipality, El Raal, Santa Cruz and El Esparragal.

== Corvera ==
It is located in the south of Murcia and covers 44.857 km^{2}. It shares borders with El Palmar, Baños y Mendigo, Valladolises, Fuente Álamo de Murcia municipality, Carrascoy and Sangonera La Verde.

== Los Dolores ==
This district is placed in the northern half of the municipality. It adjoins Puente Tocinos, Beniaján, San José de la Vega, Garres y Lages, San Benito - Barrio del Progreso and the main city.

== Era Alta ==
This district occurs in the northwestern quarter of the municipality. Its area consists of 2.25 km^{2}. It adjoins Nonduermas, the main city, Aljucer, El Palmar and San Ginés.

== El Esparragal ==
It is located in the north end and is the most northern part of Murcia and has a surface of 31.728 km^{2}. The district is adjacent to Cobatillas, Santa Cruz, Llano de Brujas, Casillas, Monteagudo and Cabezo de Torres.

== Garres y Lages ==
Garres y Lages adjoins Los Dolores, San José de la Vega, Beniaján, Algezares, San Benito - Patiño and San Benito - Barrio del Progreso.

== Gea y Truyols ==
It occurs in the southeastern quarter of Murcia and has a surface of 51.383 km^{2}. It is adjacent to Cañadas de San Pedro, Sucina, Jerónimo y Avileses, Torre-Pacheco municipality, Los Martínez del Puerto, Baños y Mendigo and Algezares.

== Guadalupe ==
This territory is placed in the northwest quarter of the municipality and covers 6.008 km^{2}. It adjoins El Puntal, Murcia, La Albatalía, Rincón de Beniscornia, La Ñora, Javalí Viejo and Molina de Segura municipality.

== Javalí Nuevo ==
This district is located in the northwestern quarter of Murcia. Its area consists of 8.95 km^{2}.It is adjacent to Torres de Cotillas municipality, Javalí Viejo, Alcantarilla municipality and Cañada Hermosa. The territory population consisted of 3.231 in 2019.

== Javalí Viejo ==
It is placed in the northwestern of the municipality and has a surface of 4.27 km^{2}. It adjoins Molina de Segura municipality, Guadalupe, La Ñora, Pueblo de Soto, Alcantarilla municipality and Javalí Nuevo. 2,283 people resided in the district in 2019.

== Jerónimo y Avileses ==
It is located in the southeast of Murcia and has an area of 39.437 km^{2}. The district shares borders with Sucina, San Javier municipality, Torre-Pachecho municipality and Gea y Truyols.

== Llano de Brujas ==
This territory occurs in the northeastern quarter of Murcia and covers7.3 km^{2}. It is adjacent to El Esparragal, Santa Cruz, Los Ramos, Torreagüera, Beniaján, Puente Tocinos and Casillas.

== Lobosillo ==
It is an exclave of the municipality and occurs in the south. Its area consists of 12.162 km^{2}. It is adjacent to Torre-Pacheco and Fuente Álamo.

== Los Martínez del Puerto ==
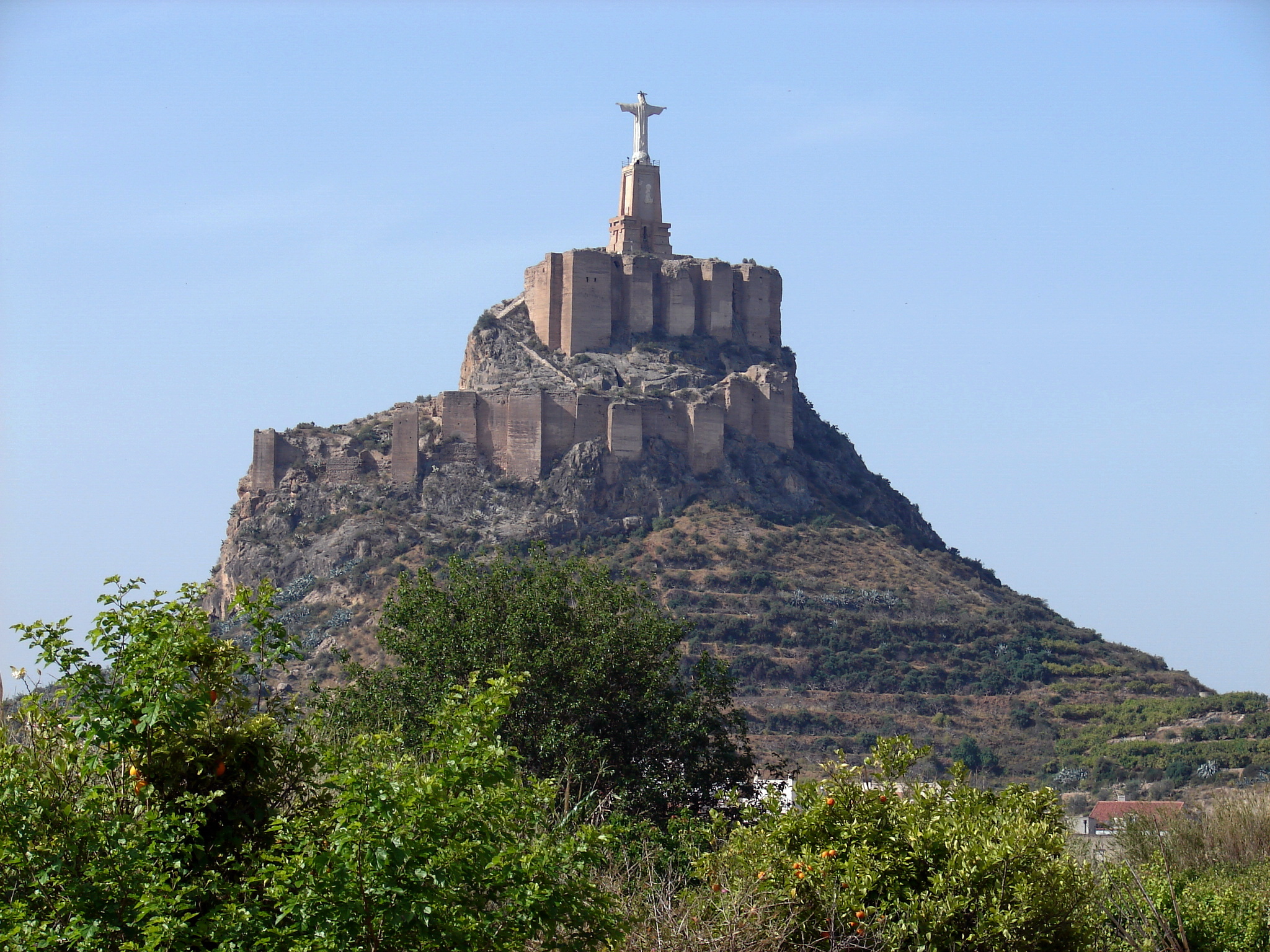
Monteagudo fortress

It occurs in the southend of Murcia and covers 29.625 km^{2}. It shares borders with Baños y Mendigo, Gea y Truyols, Torre-Pacheco municipality and Valladolises.

== Monteagudo ==
It is located in the northern half of the municipality. The district has a surface of 5.172 km^{2}. It adjoins El Esparragal, Casillas, Zaradona and Cabezo de Torres. There is an historical site: Monteagudo fortress.

== Nonduermas ==
This territory occurs in the northwestern quarter of Murcia and covers an area of 2.755 km^{2}. It shares borders with La Raya, Rincón de Seca, the main city, Era Alta, San Ginés, Sangonera la Seca, Alcantarilla municipality and Puebla de Soto.

== La Ñora ==
This territory occurs in the northwestern quarter of Murcia. It covers 2.350 km^{2}. It is adjacent to Guadalupe, Rincón de Beniscornia, La Raya, Puebla de Soto and Javalí Viejo.

== El Palmar ==
It is the most populated district of the municipality after the main town and 23,889 people resided there in 2019. It has a surface of 26.039 km^{2}. It is located in the western half of Murcia. The district shares borders with Aljucer, La Alberca, Baños y Mendigo, Corvera, Sangonera la Verde and San Ginés. There is a campus of the University of Murcia in the territory.

== Puebla de Soto ==
This district occurs in the northwestern quarter of Murcia. It has an area of 1.745 km^{2}. It adjoins La Ñora, La Raya, Nonduermas and Alcantarilla municipality. Its population consisted of 1,749 in 2019.

== Puente Tocinos ==
It is the second most populated district of the municipality and, 16,655 people resided there in 2019.Its surface consists in 5.335 km^{2}. It shares borders with Casillas, Llano de Brujas, Beniaján, Los Dolores, Murcia and Zarandona.

== El Puntal ==
This territory occurs in the northwest end of Murcia. It has an area of 9.687 km^{2}. It shares borders with Churra, Murcia, Guadalupe and Molina de Segura.

== El Raal ==
This district is placed in the northeast of Murcia and has a surface of 8,178 km^{2}. It adjoins Santomera municipality, Beniel municipality, Alquerías, Santa Cruz and Cobatillas. It had a population of 6,334 in 2019.

== Los Ramos ==
This territory occurs in the northeastern quarter. Its area consists of 6.5 km^{2}. It is adjacent to Alquerías, Zeneta, Cañadas de San Pedro, Torreagüera, Llano de Brujas and Cruz.

== La Raya ==
It is located in the northwestern quarter of the municipality and covers 2.901 km^{2}. The territory shares borders with Rincón de Beniscornia, Rincón de Seca, Nonduermas and Puebla de Soto.

== Rincón de Beniscornia ==
This territory is located in the northwestern quarter of Murcia and has a surface of 1.008 km^{2}. The district adjoins Guadalupe, Rincón de Seca, La Raya and La Ñora. There were 954 inhabitants in 2019.

== Rincón de Seca ==
It is placed in the northwestern quarter of the municipality. Its area consists in 1.7 km^{2}. The territory shares borders with La Arboleja, the main city, Nonduermas, La Raya and Rincón de Beniscornia. Its population consisted of 2,267 in 2019.

== San Benito - Patiño ==
This district is placed in the northern half of the municipality. It covers 4.075 km^{2}. It adjoins the main city, San Benito - Barrio del Progreso, Garres y Lages, Algezares, Santo Ángel and Aljucer.

== San Benito - Barrio del Progreso ==
It is located in the northern half of Murcia. It has an area of 4.075 km^{2}. The territory shares borders with Los Dolores, Garres y Lages, San Benito - Patiño and the main city.

== San Ginés ==
It is placed in the southeast of the northwestern quarter of Murcia and has a surface of 2.477 km^{2}. It adjoins Nonduermas, Era Alta, El Palmar and Sangonera la Seca.

== Sangonera La Seca ==
This is the largest district and covers 74.208 km^{2}. It is located in the west of the municipality. It shares borders with San Ginés, El Palmar, Corvera, Carrascoy and Sangonera la Verde.

== Sangonera La Verde ==
This territory is placed in the western half of Murcia. Its surface consists in 14.418 km^{2}. It adjoins Cañada Hermosa, Alcantarilla municipality, Nonduermas, San Ginés, Sangonera la Verde, Carrascoy, Alhama de Murcia municipality and Librilla municipality.

== San José de la Vega ==
This district is placed in the southwestern of the northeastern quarter of the municipality. It has an area of 2.244 km^{2}. The territory shares borders with Beniaján, Garres y Lages and Los Dolores.

== Santa Cruz ==
It occurs in the northeast of Murcia and covers 4.239 km^{2}. The district shares borders with Cobatillas, El Raal, Alquerías, Los Ramos, Llano de Brujas an dEl Esparragal.

== Santiago y Zaraiche ==
It is placed in the north of Murcia and has a surface of 1.26 km^{2}. The territory is adjacent to Cabezo de Torres, Zarandona, the main city and Churra.

== Santo Ángel ==
This territory is located in the centre of the municipality. Its area consists in 6.983 km^{2}. It shares borders with San Benito - Patiño, Algeazares, Baños y Mendigo, La Alberca and Aljucer.

== Sucina ==
It occurs in the southeast end of the municipality. The district covers 65.361 km^{2}. It shares borders with Cañadas de San Pedro, San Pedro del Pinatar municipality, San Javier municipality, Jerónimo y Avileses and Gea y Truyols.

== Torreagüera ==
This territory occurs in the northeastern quarter of Murcia. Its surface consists in 7.773 km^{2}. It adjoins Llano de Brujas, Los Ramos, Cañadas de San Pedro and Beniaján.

== Valladolises ==
It is placed in the south of Murcia and is the most southern territory in Murcia after the exclave Lobosillo. The territory covers 42.614 km^{2}. The district is adjacent to Baños y Mendigo, Los Martínez del Puerto and Fuente Álamo de Murcia municipality.

== Zarandona ==
The territory is placed in the northern half of Murcia and has a surface of 2.395 km^{2}. It adjoins Cabezo de Torres, Monteagudo, Casillas, Puente Tocinos, Murcia and Santiago y Zaraiche.

== Zeneta ==
This district is located in the northeastern quarter of the municipality and has an area of 8.425 km^{2}. It shares borders with Beniel municipality, Cañadas de San Pedro, Los Ramos and Alquerías.
