= Corvera (Murcia) =

District of Murcia, Spain

- Outlying district
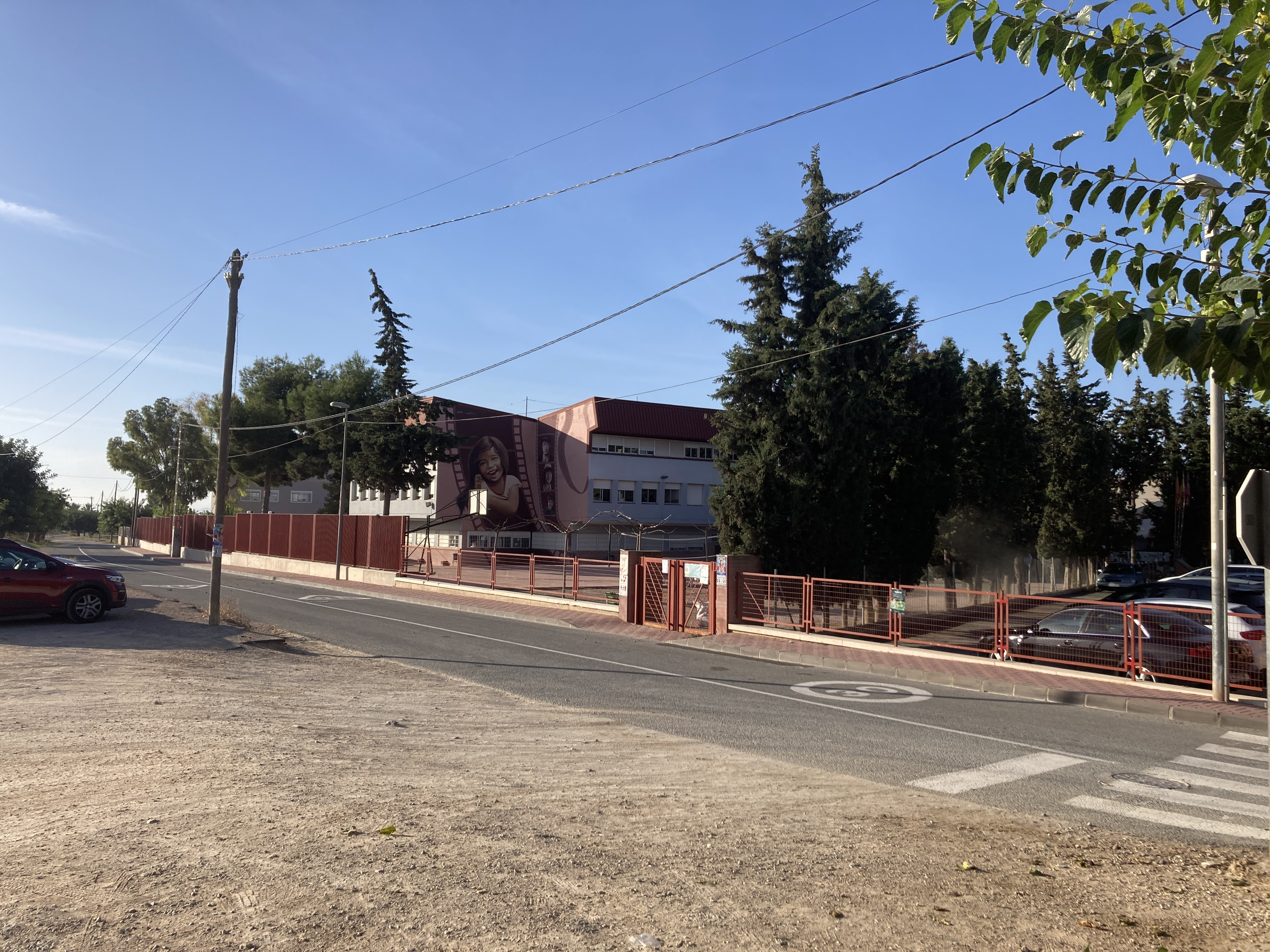
- CPEIBas Isabel Bellvís, the public school in Corvera

- Location of Corvera in Spain
- Coordinates: 37.8333°N 1.1667°W
- Country: Spain
- Autonomous community: Murcia
- Municipality: Murcia

Area
  - Total: 44,857 km^{2} (17,319 sq mi)

Population (2021)
  - Total: 2,808
- Time zone: UTC+1 (CET)
  - Summer (DST): UTC+2 (CEST)
- Postal code: 30153
- Dialing code: +34 968

Corvera is an outlying district (Spanish: pedanía) of the municipality of Murcia, Spain.

== Geography ==
Corvera is located in the southeast of the Iberian Peninsula, in the Segura River valley. It has a Mediterranean climate, with hot summers and mild winters. The average annual temperature is 18.2 °C (64.8 °F; 291.3 K), and the average annual rainfall is 320 millimetres (13 in).

Corvera is bordered by:

- To the north: Sangonera la Verde and El Palmar
- To the east: Baños y Mendigo
- To the west: Carrascoy-La Murta
- To the south: Valladolises y Lo Jurado and the municipality of Fuente Álamo.

== Transport ==
The new Murcia International Airport is located in Corvera. It was inaugurated on 15 January 2019 and is situated 35 km from the San Javier Airport, which at that time became an exclusively military airport.

Corvera is also connected by road to Murcia and other nearby towns by the RM-2 and RM-19 highways.

== Education ==
The public school in Corvera is called "CPEIBas Isabel Bellvís". It was built between 1977 and 1978 as a preschool and primary school and in 2007 it added secondary education as well.
