= Real Sociedad Club de Campo de Murcia =

The Real Sociedad Club de Campo de Murcia is a social and sports club located in the district of El Palmar, within the municioality of Murcia (España).

The club has been associated with the development of tennis players and hosts sports academies. The Spanish tennis player Carlos Alcaraz trained in this environment during his chldhood, practicing at it facilities.
