= Carlos Alcántara (footballer) =

Spanish footballer (born 1985)

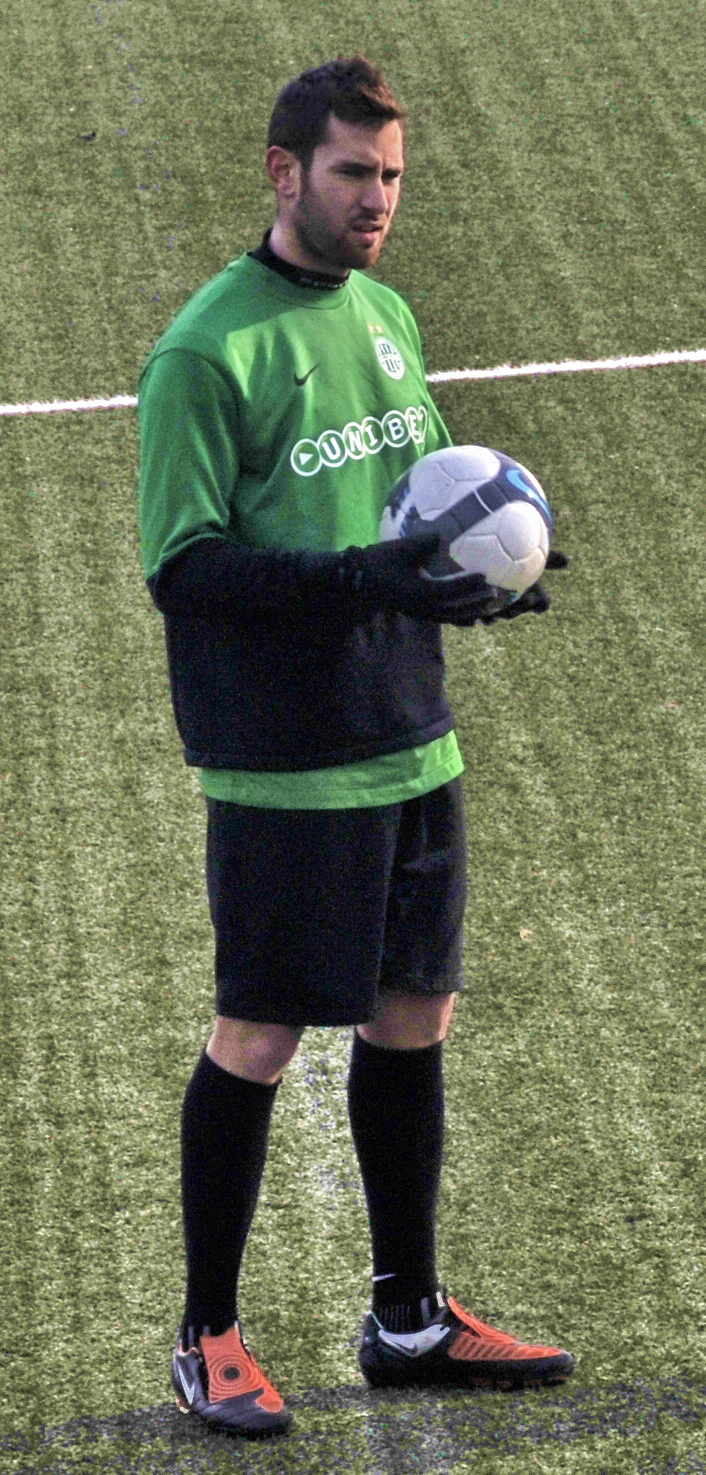
- Alcántara with Ferencváros in 2010

Personal information
- Full name: Carlos Alcántara Cuevas
- Date of birth: 1 February 1985 (age 41)
- Place of birth: Zarandona, Spain
- Height: 1.78 m (5 ft 10 in)
- Position: Left-back

Youth career
- Nueva Vanguardia
- Villarreal

Senior career*
Years	Team	Apps	(Gls)
2004–2006	Villarreal B		
2004–2006	Villarreal	5	(0)
2006–2008	Deportivo La Coruña	0	(0)
2006–2007	→ Jaén (loan)	12	(0)
2007–2008	→ Cartagena (loan)	12	(0)
2008–2009	Atlético Ciudad	35	(0)
2009–2010	Ferencváros	8	(0)
2010–2011	Alicante	34	(0)
2011–2012	Leganés	26	(0)
2012–2013	Alcoyano	34	(0)
2013–2014	Logroñés	34	(1)
2014–2016	La Hoya Lorca	63	(1)
2016–2017	Eldense	20	(0)
2017	La Roda	14	(0)
2017–2018	El Palmar	27	(3)
2018–2021	Atlético Pulpileño	65	(2)
2021–2022	Cieza		
2022–2024	Ciudad Murcia	26	(1)
2024–2025	El Raal	11	(0)
Total		426	(8)
- * Club domestic league appearances and goals

Carlos Alcántara Cuevas (born 1 February 1985) is a Spanish former professional footballer who played as a left-back.

== Club career ==
Born in Zarandona, Region of Murcia, Alcántara signed with Villarreal CF in 2004, spending the vast majority of his spell with the reserves and appearing in five La Liga games over the course of two seasons; his debut came on 17 October 2004, when he started and finished a 1–1 draw away to RCD Mallorca. Additionally, he featured in both legs of the 3–2 aggregate loss against NK Maribor in the third round of the 2006 UEFA Intertoto Cup.

Subsequently, Alcántara joined Deportivo de La Coruña, never appearing officially during his two-year stint and being loaned to two clubs in the Segunda División B, for which he also played sparingly. In the 2008–09 campaign, he represented another side at that level, CF Atlético Ciudad.

After a spell in Hungary with Ferencvárosi TC, Alcántara returned to his country and joined Alicante CF also in the third tier. He continued to compete in that league the following years, representing CD Leganés, CD Alcoyano, SD Logroñés, La Hoya Lorca CF, CD Eldense and La Roda CF.
