= Aguaderas =

- Etymology: Water trough
- Location in Spain
- Coordinates: 37.631°N 1.598°W
- Country: Spain
- Province: Murcia
- Municipality: Lorca

Population
  - Total: 765

Aguaderas is a village in Murcia, Spain. It is part of the municipality of Lorca.

As of 2022, Aguaderas has about 800 inhabitants, of which 413 are males.

Aguaderas' economy is primarily agricultural, with livestock (cattle and pigs) and small farms growing seasonal crops (including broccoli, artichoke, melon, and watermelon).

== History ==
Aguaderas was part of New Carthage, a colony of Carthage.

The area was colonized by the Roman republic before 100 BCE.

It became part of Islamic Spain in about 711. It was part of the Emirate of Granada until 1452. On 17 March 1452, the combined forces of the Kingdom of Castile and its client kingdom, the Kingdom of Murcia, took over as part of the Reconquista in the Battle of Los Alporchones. The Aguaderas Castle, site of the battle, was built in the 12th and 13th centuries, as a fortification to control the rural district.

There was a brief skirmish at Aguaderas during the Spanish Civil War on 30 March 1938.

== Culture ==
There is a major week-long annual festival each October in Aguaderas, to honor the Blessed Virgin. Traditional Spanish folk music is still performed in Aguaderas.

There is a small Church southeast of the village called Ermita Sacristán, which is the site of some traditional cultural events.

== Transportation ==
The RM-D7 and RM-D8 are two paved regional roads that go through the village.

There is no regularly scheduled public transportation to the village. The closest train stations are in Lorca, including Lorca-Sutullena railway station, which is served by the Cercanías Murcia/Alicante commuter trains. The station is about a 15 minute drive from the village or almost two hours' walk. LatBus offers only on-call and school bus services.

== Politics ==
During the election campaign of 2015, the People's Party held a rally and meal for more than 300 people in the village (almost half the population turned out).
