= Campo Verde (disambiguation) =

Campo Verde is a municipality in the state of Mato Grosso, Brazil.

Campo Verde may also refer to:

- Campo Verde, Texas, a census-designated place in Starr County, Texas, United States
- Campo Verde High School, a school in Arizona, United States of America
- Campo Verde Solar Project, a solar photovoltaic power station in Imperial County, California

== See also ==
- Campoverde (disambiguation)
- Camp Verde (disambiguation)
