= Camp Verde =

Campo Verd may refer to:

- Camp Verde, Arizona, town in Yavapai County, Arizona, United States
- Camp Verde, Texas, unincorporated community in Kerr County, Texas, United States

== See also ==
- Campoverde (disambiguation)
- Campo Verde (disambiguation)
