= La Raya, Murcia =

Village in Spain

Coordinates: 37°59′N 1°11′W

La Raya de Santiago, or simply La Raya, is a village or pedanía (suburban district) of the municipality of Murcia, in Región de Murcia (Spain). There are 2,289 inhabitants (INE 2004) and it has an approximate area of 2,901 km². It is situated in the central area of the orchard of Murcia, on the right bank of river Segura, 4 km from Murcia city centre and 55 metres above sea level.

Boundaries:

- North: La Ñora and Rincón de Beniscornia, separated by the river Segura.
- East: Rincón de Seca.
- West: Puebla de Soto.
- South: Nonduermas.

The village is formed by a central urban area and several neighbourhoods spread among orchards and plots: Los Caseros, Los Seanos, Los Sacristanes, Los Remendaos, Los Pajareros and Los Cerriches to the south; Los Terueles, Los Comunes and Los Aristones to the east; La Generala, El Gilandario, El Relenco, el Caserío de Los Pintaos and la Voz Negra to the west; and El Palomar-Camino del Cementerio, Los Pujantes, el Puente del Remolino, el Molino del Batán and el Caserío de Ruíz López to the north.
