= Región de Murcia International Airport =

Commercial airport serving Murcia, Spain

Región de Murcia International Airport Aeropuerto Internacional Región de Murcia

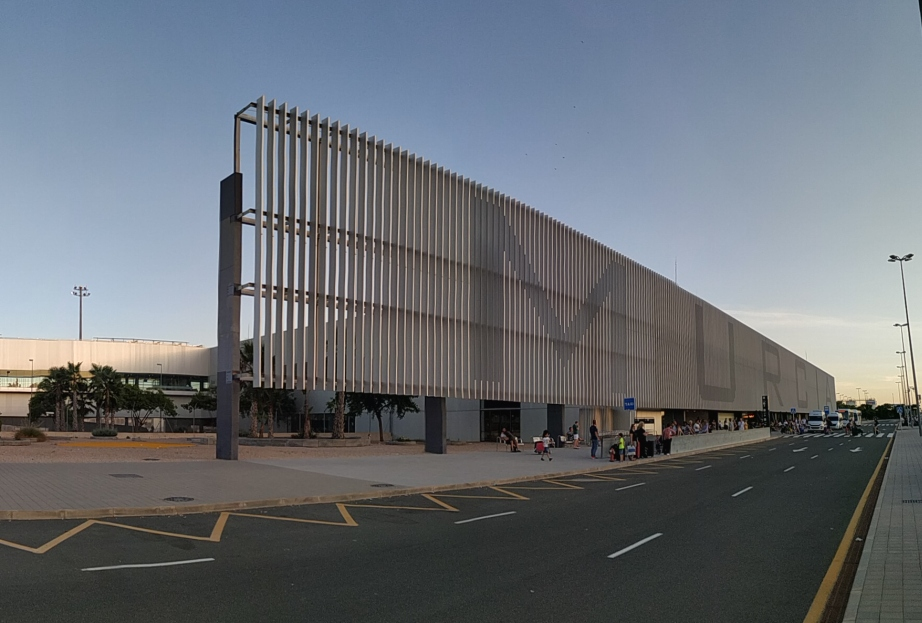
- IATA: RMU; ICAO: LEMI

Summary
- Airport type: Public
- Owner: Comunidad Autónoma de la Región de Murcia
- Operator: AENA
- Serves: Region of Murcia
- Location: Valladolises, Murcia
- Opened: 15 January 2019; 7 years ago
- Elevation AMSL: 193 m (633 ft)
- Coordinates: 37°48′09.3″N 01°07′31.4″W
- Website: www.aena.es/es/aeropuerto-region-murcia/index.html

Map
- Location within Spain

Runways
Direction	Length		Surface
Direction	m	ft	Surface
05/23	3,000	9,843	Asphalt

Statistics (2024)
- Passengers: ▲907,668 (+3,4%)
- Movements: ▲7,140(+6,6%)
- Source: Spanish AIP at EUROCONTROL, Aena

Región de Murcia International Airport (IATA: RMU, ICAO: LEMI), informally also known as Murcia-Corvera, is an international airport in southeast Spain. It opened in January 2019 and replaced Murcia–San Javier Airport. It is situated between the villages of Corvera, Los Martínez del Puerto and Valladolises within the municipality of Murcia.

== Development ==
Tourism to the Murcia region has grown steadily for several decades, becoming popular as a less expensive alternative to established holiday areas such as the Costa del Sol. Expansion of the airport serving the area, Murcia–San Javier Airport, was becoming impractical due to its primary function as a military airfield and component of the Academia General del Aire, the officer training school of the Spanish Air Force.

In 2002 the company Aeromur (Aeropuertos de la Región de Murcia) was formed as a vehicle for investment, finance and promotion of a new regional airport. In 2006, the regional government put construction and operation of the airport out to tender. The Aeromur consortium, now including construction firm Sacyr, won the tender for a term of 40 years and announced it would invest 550 million euros in the project.

Construction work began in July 2008, with the opening of the airport planned for 2010. In 2009 building stopped as Sacyr had run out of money. As banks were not willing to loan the funds to Sacyr, the regional government stepped in and guaranteed 200 million euros of credit. The airport was completed in 2012, but did not become operational until 2019, after years of contractual wrangling between the regional government, Aeromur and Sacyr. Before opening, the concession for operating the airport was withdrawn from Aeromur and awarded to Aena.

The airport was officially opened on 15 January 2019 by the King of Spain as Aeropuerto Internacional de la Región de Murcia – Juan de la Cierva, named after the Spanish aeronautical pioneer who invented the autogyro. The first flight to arrive at the airport was Ryanair flight FR1824 from East Midlands Airport.

== Criticism ==
The airport has faced considerable controversy and criticism due to significant cost overruns and unmet expectations. The Regional Assembly of Murcia approved a commission in 2024 to investigate the “failed settlement for damages” in the airport’s construction and operation. Key criticisms include the closure of the nearby San Javier Airport—previously serving over 2 million passengers in 2007—in favor of Corvera Airport, which only surpassed 800,000 passengers in 2023. Despite earlier promises that the new infrastructure would cost "not a single euro" to the citizens of Murcia, the airport has allegedly incurred costs exceeding 300 million euros as of 2024. Additionally, initial projections that the airport would support 16 flights per hour and create 20,000 jobs have not materialized, as current operations and employment figures fall far below these targets.

Despite its low utilization, Corvera Airport has faced significant issues with flight punctuality, making it the least punctual airport in Spain, with only 64.5% of flights departing on time. This has added to the ongoing concerns about its efficiency and viability as a regional transport hub.

== Facilities ==
The airport has a single passenger terminal of 28,500 m^{2} and a single runway 3,000 metres long and 45 metres wide. Its initial capacity is 3 million passengers and 23,000 movements per year, with options for an increase to 5 million passengers. The terminal has 9 boarding gates, 25 check-in desks and 4 baggage reclaim belts. The runway has one rapid-exit taxiway (RET) and 4 holding bays. It is equipped with precision approach instrument ILS CAT I at threshold 23 and non-precision instrument DVOR/DME.

== Airlines and destinations ==
The following airlines operate regular scheduled and charter flights at Región de Murcia Airport:

Airlines	Destinations
Air Arabia	Nador
Binter Canarias	Gran Canaria, Tenerife–North
easyJet	Bristol, London–Gatwick, London–Luton; Seasonal: Manchester Liverpool
Ryanair	Birmingham, Dublin, London–Stansted, Manchester; Seasonal: Bournemouth, East Midlands, Glasgow–Prestwick, London–Luton
Smartwings	Brno, Prague
TUI fly Belgium	Seasonal: Ostend/Bruges
Volotea	Barcelona, Marseille; Seasonal: Asturias, Bilbao, Lille, Venice (begins 28 June 2026)

== Statistics ==
=== Annual traffic ===
Traffic by calendar year
	Passengers	Movements	Cargo (kilos)
2019	1,090,712	7,976	0
2020	217,912	2,812	0
2021	283,488	3,365	0
2022	839,166	6,663	0
2023	878,193	6,700	0
2024	907,668	7,140	0
2025	947,438	7,640	0
Source: Estadísticas de tráfico aereo

The year 2020 saw a decline in passengers and movements, due to the COVID-19 pandemic and travel restrictions that were implemented globally. A total of 217,912 passengers in 2,812 movements passed through the airport, which represented a decrease of 80% and 64.7%, respectively, compared to 2019.

=== Busiest routes ===
Busiest international routes from RMU (2023)
Rank	Destination	Passengers	Change 2023/24
1	Manchester	126,315	▲16%
2	London-Gatwick	110,170	▼30%
3	London-Stansted	106,327	▼2%
4	Dublin	77,921	▲7%
5	London-Luton	72,256	▼6%
6	Birmingham	48,691	▼3%
7	Bristol	39,337	▲13%
8	East Midlands	37,903	▼23%
9	Oujda	33,720	▲44%
10	Glasgow-Prestwick	32,071	▲45%
Source: Estadísticas de tráfico aereo

Busiest Spanish routes from RMU (2024)
Rank	Destination	Passengers	Change 2023/24
1	Gran Canaria	36,737	▲14%
2	Barcelona	29,866	▲1117%
3	Madrid	15,001	▲441%
4	Bilbao	11,315	▲66459%
5	Asturias	10,163	▼6%
Source: Estadísticas de tráfico aereo

== Access ==
The airport is 25 kilometres (16 mi) from the city of Murcia and 35 kilometres (22 mi) from Cartagena. It has direct access to the Autovía A-30 highway that runs between the two cities. There are several public bus routes connecting the airport to its surrounding areas.

In 2009, plans were revealed for the AVE high-speed rail network to serve the airport via a proposed Murcia to Cartagena line. This plan appears to have been abandoned.
