= Corvera =

Corvera is the name of a number of places in Spain:

- Corvera de Asturias, a concejo in Asturias
- Corvera de Toranzo, a municipio (municipality) in Cantabria
- Corvera (Cantabria), a city in that municipio
- Corvera (Murcia), a pedanía (autonomous region) in the municipio of Murcia
