= Rubber Industry Smallholders Development Authority =

Malaysian federal government agency

- Pihak Berkuasa Kemajuan Pekebun Kecil Perusahaan Getah (RISDA)

Federal agency overview
- Formed: 1 January 1973; 53 years ago
- Preceding Federal agency: Rubber Industry Replanting Board (RIRB) (1952–1972)
- Type: Federal government
- Jurisdiction: Government of Malaysia
- Headquarters: Bangunan RISDA, KM 7, Jalan Ampang, 50990 Kuala Lumpur, Malaysia
- Minister responsible: Ahmad Zahid Hamidi, Minister of Rural and Regional Development
- Federal agency executives: Manndzri Nasib, Chairperson; Zainal Azni Zulkifli, Director-General
- Parent Federal agency: Ministry of Rural and Regional Development
- Key document: Rubber Industry Smallholders Development Authority Act 1972
- Website: www.risda.gov.my

The Rubber Industry Smallholders Development Authority (Malay: Pihak Berkuasa Kemajuan Pekebun Kecil Perusahaan Getah), abbreviated RISDA, is a Malaysian federal government agency under the Ministry of Rural and Regional Development. Established in 1973, it entrusted to oversee the smallholder sector as an important production sector in the national economy. RISDA also provides higher education through its educational institution, the University College of Agroscience Malaysia (UCAM; formerly RISDA College).

== History ==
RISDA traces its roots to 1952 with the establishment of the Rubber Industry Replanting Board (RIRB) which headquartered at the District Office in Jalan Raja, Kuala Lumpur. The RIRB provides basic principles for development and modernisation programmes for rubber smallholders. By the end of 1960s, the RIRB faced problems to expanding its operations and finally dissolved on 31 December 1972.

RISDA was established on 1 January 1973 under the powers passed by Parliament: the Rubber Industry Smallholders Development Authority (RISDA) Act 1972 [Act 85] and the Rubber Industry Fund (Replanting) Ordinance 1952. It commenced operations on 8 February 1973, taking over many functions of its predecessor agency, the RIRB and its launch was officiated by the-then Prime Minister, Abdul Razak Hussein.

In 1978, RISDA announced it went on to venture the plantation business to help upgrade its service to rubber industry smallholders in Malaysia, particularly in the state of Perak. The agency through its preliminary estimation stated that 20,234 hectares of estates would be approved for replanting and it would spend RM63 million in replanting grants.

In 1981, RISDA transferred management and development of 42.120 hectares of its estates to its newly-established subsidiary, Smallholders Estate Sdn. Bhd.

By 1994, RISDA began to privatize its three main activities within its organisation to reduced expenditure and trim size of its workforce.

RISDA began collaborating with now-defunct Malaysian internet service provider, Jaring Communications in 2005 to utilize the Virtual Private Network (VPN) system for its 42 centres nationwide, which connected via internet directly to its headquarters in Kuala Lumpur.

In December 2010, the agency established RISDA Entrepreneurs Club (RISEC) with the aim to empowering rubber smallholders in generating the nation's income.

== Act and functions ==
RISDA's functions are clearly defined by the RISDA Act 1972. As prescribed in the Act 85, among of its functions are:

- To implement development policies and programs to ensure the growth and viability of the smallholder sector of rubber industry;
- To plan, coordinate, implement and monitor the Scheme provided and approved under the provisions of Part VI of the RISDA Act 1972;
- To provide technical services, advice, training and education programs to the smallholder sector;
- To collect and manage statistics or information necessary and maintain records relating to the smallholder sector;
- To plan and implement any other activities that may improve the social and economic well-being of smallholders;
- To ensure that the smallholder sector is modernized to improve the social and economic well-being of smallholders;
- To do any other things that enable it to perform its functions effectively or incidental to the performance of its functions.

== Subsidiaries ==
- RISDA Holdings Sdn. Bhd.
- RISDA Plantations Sdn. Bhd.
- RISDA Semaian & Langskap Sdn. Bhd.
- RISDA Baja Sdn. Bhd.
- RISDA Ventures Sdn. Bhd.
- RISDA Fleet Sdn. Bhd.
- Permodalan RISDA Bhd.
- Estet Pekebun Kecil Sdn. Bhd. (ESPEK)

== Education ==
RISDA's education arm, the RISDA College (Malay: Kolej RISDA), formerly known as RISDA Training Institute (Malay: Institut Latihan RISDA), is established in 1999 to help the children of the rubber industry smallholders to have the opportunity to pursue higher education, if they are not admitted to public universities. The college, which was located in Alor Gajah, Malacca, also offers academic study programs at certificate and diploma levels. In 2014, RISDA College is upgraded into a university college and renamed as the University College of Agroscience Malaysia (Malay: Kolej Universiti Agrosains Malaysia; UCAM).

== See also ==
- Malaysian Rubber Board
- Rubber Research Institute of Malaysia
- Rubber industry in Malaysia
