= UD Horadada =

Spanish football team

Horadada
- Full name: Unión Deportiva Horadada
- Nickname(s): Horadada Reds
- Founded: 1972
- Dissolved: 2020
- Ground: Estadio Ikomar; Pilar de la Horadada, Spain
- Capacity: 3,500
- Chairman: (Spain) José Alfonso Ballester
- Manager: (Spain) Antonio Pedreño Saura
- 2019–20: Regional Preferente – Group 4, 12th of 18
Home colours	Away colours

Unión Deportiva Horadada was the local team in Pilar de la Horadada in Spain's Province of Alicante. U.D. Horadada had several sponsors, including Grupo Caliche and the Town Hall.

== History ==
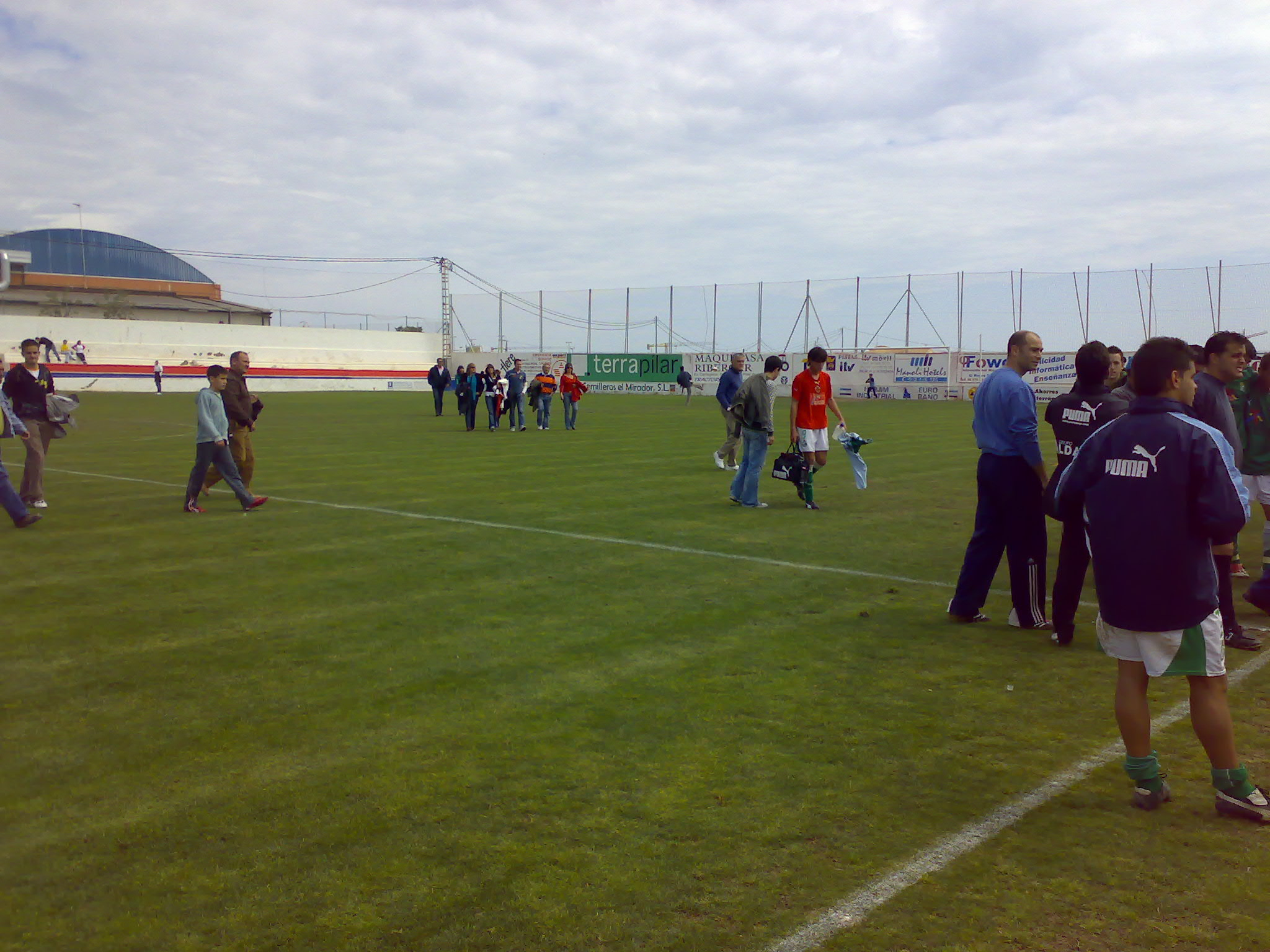
The Ikomar after a 1–0 win over Elche Ilicitano in 2007

The team was founded in 1972. They played in the Segunda División B for one season (1992/3), they otherwise have always played in the Tercera División. They have reached the league play-offs twice.

For the start of the 2006/7 season, they changed to Group VI (Valencia) from Group XIII (Murcia). This was due to the Real Federación Española's decision to make all clubs play for their corresponding regional league.

During their brief stint in the Segunda División B, they reached the third round of the Copa del Rey. Their success ended when they lost 1–9 away to Deportivo La Coruña.

As of late, the club has been dogged by financial problems. Indeed, in July 2007, Horadada were forced to sell their Tercera División status to Villarreal C in order to stave off bankruptcy. In doing so Villarreal C moved from Preferente to Tercera while Horadada moved in the opposite direction.

In August 2020, the club did not register for the 2020–21 Regional Preferente campaign due to the lack of sponsorship, and later was dissolved. A new club in the city named CD Horadada Thiar was founded afterwards, but only lasted three years as a senior in the Segunda Regional.

== Stadium and Kit ==
The name of their stadium is Ikomar, named this because of its location on a slope. Their kit consists of a red shirt, purple shorts and blue socks.

== Season to season ==
Season	Tier	Division	Place	Copa del Rey
1972–73	6	2ª Reg.	10th	
1973–74	6	2ª Reg.	13th	
1974–75	6	2ª Reg.	6th	
1975–76	6	2ª Reg.	6th	
1976–77	6	2ª Reg.	7th	
1977–78	7	2ª Reg.	1st	
1978–79	6	1ª Reg.	1st	
1979–80	5	Reg. Pref.	12th	
1980–81	4	3ª	17th	
1981–82	4	3ª	13th	
1982–83	4	3ª	18th	
1983–84	5	Reg. Pref.	1st	
1984–85	4	3ª	8th	
1985–86	4	3ª	16th	
1986–87	4	3ª	18th	
1987–88	4	3ª	5th	
1988–89	4	3ª	10th	
1989–90	4	3ª	14th	
1990–91	4	3ª	10th	
1991–92	4	3ª	2nd	

Season	Tier	Division	Place	Copa del Rey
1992–93	3	2ª B	20th	Third round
1993–94	4	3ª	15th	First round
1994–95	4	3ª	20th	
1995–96	5	Reg. Pref.	19th	
1996–97	5	Terr. Pref.	2nd	
1997–98	4	3ª	10th	
1998–99	4	3ª	4th	
1999–2000	4	3ª	2nd	
2000–01	4	3ª	11th	
2001–02	4	3ª	18th	
2002–03	5	Terr. Pref.	3rd	
2003–04	4	3ª	3rd	
2004–05	4	3ª	7th	
2005–06	4	3ª	13th	
2006–07	4	3ª	14th	
2007–08	5	Reg. Pref.	1st	
2008–09	5	Reg. Pref.	6th	
2009–10	5	Reg. Pref.	2nd	
2010–11	5	Reg. Pref.	13th	
2011–12	5	Reg. Pref.	8th	

Season	Tier	Division	Place	Copa del Rey
2012–13	5	Reg. Pref.	1st	
2013–14	5	Reg. Pref.	8th	
2014–15	5	Reg. Pref.	12th	
2015–16	5	Reg. Pref.	18th	
2016–17	6	1ª Reg.	9th	
2017–18	6	1ª Reg.	2nd	
2018–19	5	Reg. Pref.	12th	
2019–20	5	Reg. Pref.	12th	

- 1 season in Segunda División B
- 22 seasons in Tercera División

== Notable former players ==
- (Czech Republic) Marcel Lička
- (England) Chris Burns
- (Equatorial Guinea) Fernando Obama
- (Poland) Kamil Glik
- (Poland) Marcin Pontus
- (Poland) Kamil Wilczek
- (Poland) Szymon Matuszek
