= Pilar de la Horadada =

- Municipality
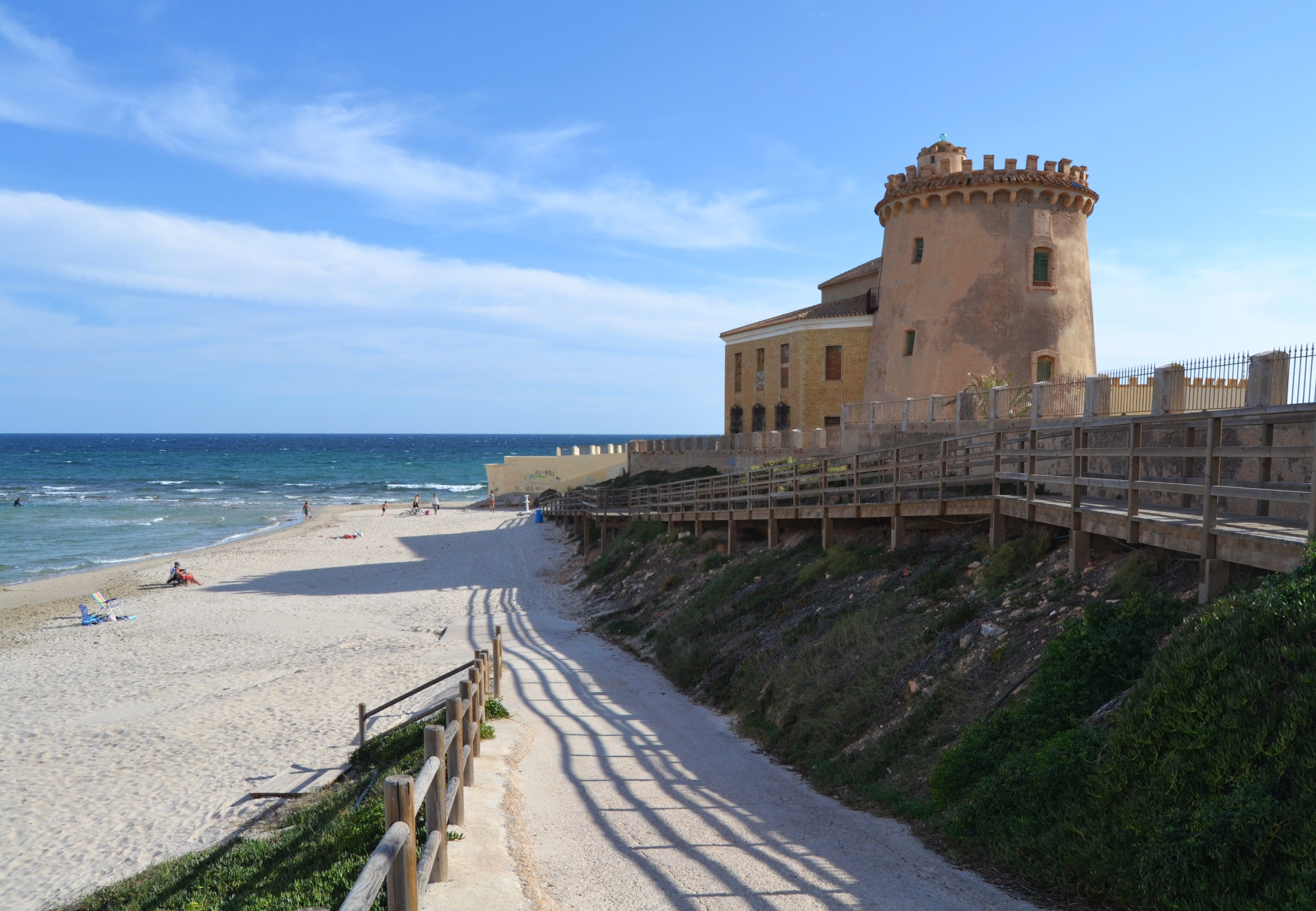

- Flag Coat of arms
- Motto: Mar y Montaña (Sea and Mountains)
- Location in Spain Pilar de la Horadada (Valencian Community) Pilar de la Horadada (Spain)
- Coordinates: 37°52′N 0°47′W
- Country: Spain
- Autonomous community: Valencian Community
- Province: Alicante
- Comarca: Vega Baja del Segura
- Judicial district: Orihuela

Government
  - Alcalde: José Fidel Ros (2012) José María Perez (2019-) (PP)

Area
  - Total: 78.10 km^{2} (30.15 sq mi)
- Elevation: 35 m (115 ft)

Population (2025-01-01)
  - Total: 24,316
  - Density: 311.3/km^{2} (806.4/sq mi)
- Demonyms: Pilareño -a
- Official language(s): Spanish; Valencian
- Linguistic area: Spanish
- Time zone: UTC+1 (CET)
  - Summer (DST): UTC+2 (CEST)
- Postal code: 03190-03191-03192
- Website: Official website

Pilar de la Horadada (Spanish pronunciation: [piˈlaɾ ðe la oɾaˈðaða]) is a town and district in the Province of Alicante, in the southeast of Spain. Located 66 km south of Alicante, the city is the southernmost of the Valencian Community, only 1 km north of the regional border (with the Province of Murcia).

The town and its neighbouring villages (Pinar de Campoverde and Torre de la Horadada) are home to thousands of British, German and northern European expatriates. Region de Murcia Airport RMU (Corvera, Murcia) is within close proximity.

== Geography and Ecology ==
The district boasts great ecological value, with an abundance of hawthorn, globularia, mastic, Kermes Oak and chamaerops.

There are many birds of prey to be found in the region, such as peregrine falcons, golden eagles, European sparrowhawks and kestrels.

== Monuments and interesting places ==
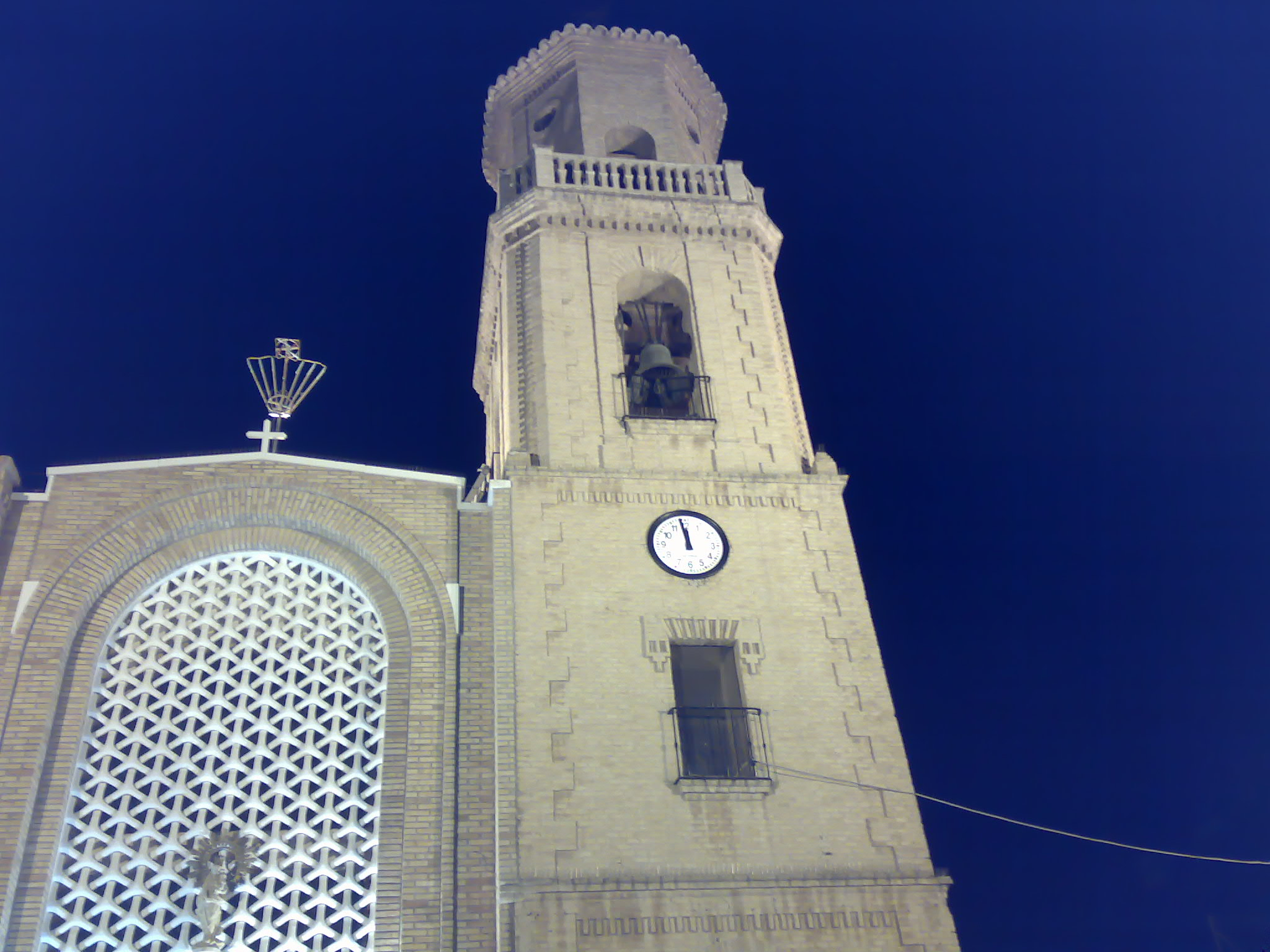
Church on New Year's Eve 2006

- Parish Church of "Nuestra Señora del Pilar", in the centre of the town. It was built in 1986 on the same site as its predecessor. The bell tower of the original structure stands to this day. Its advocation is to the Blessed Virgin (Virgen del Pilar). In the building there are many examples of religious art, especially works from the local artists José María Sánchez Lozano and Manuel Ribera Girona.

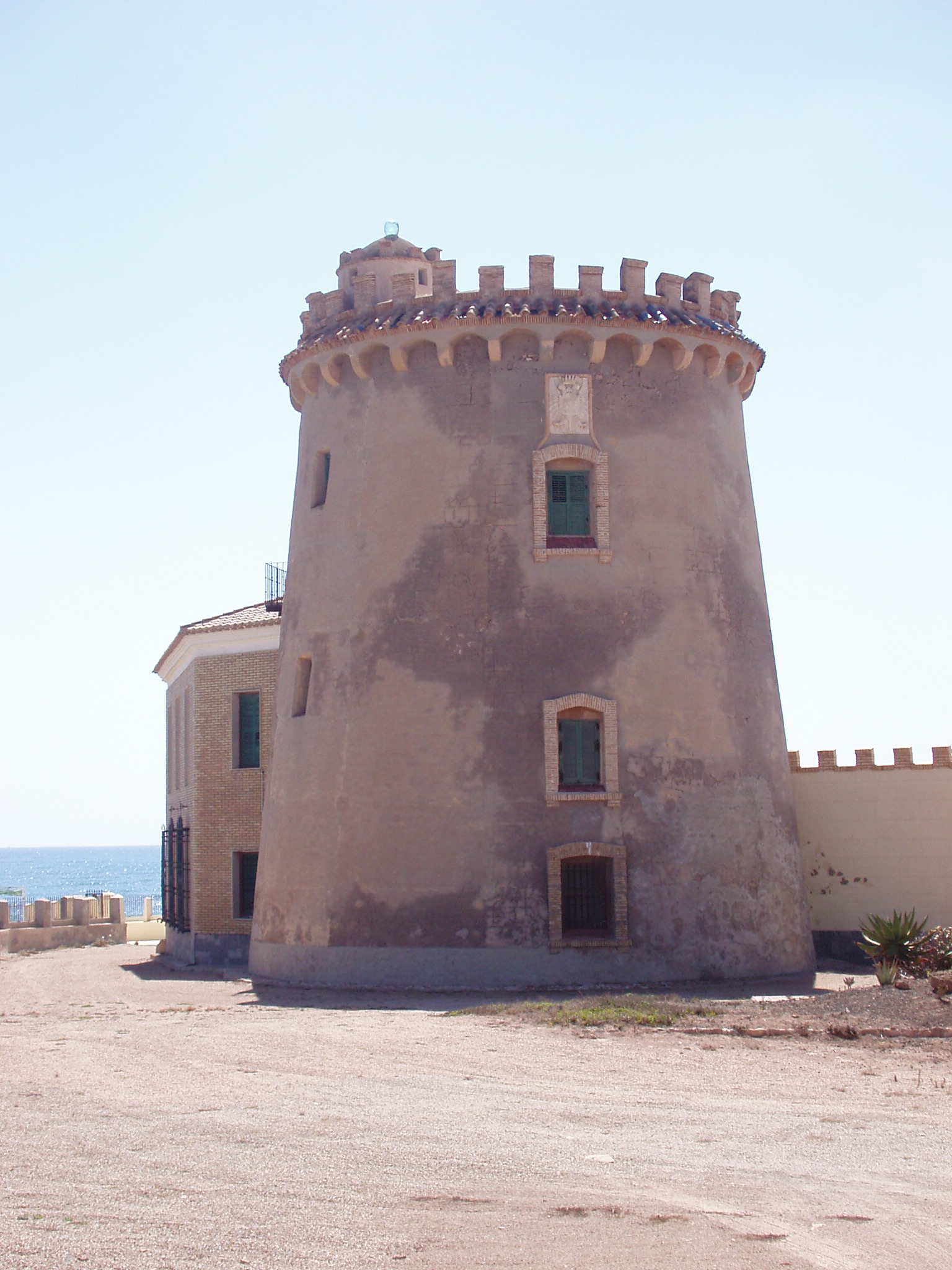
Torre de la Horadada Watch Tower

- Watch Tower (16th century), built in 1591 to protect inhabitants of the town against the Mediterranean pirates. It is situated on the beach, in the nearby village of Torre de la Horadada.
- Río Seco in Pinar de Campoverde: a local river without water for most of the year. The area is home to a lot of native animals and plants.
- Protected Zone of Sierra Escalona: protected in order to preserve native animals, particularly the birds.
- Archaeological ruins of Thiar: an old Roman town on the Vía Augusta, the main route between Illici (Elche) and Carthago Nova (Cartagena), two of the most important Roman cities in Spain.
- Archaeological – Ethnological Museum
- Remains of a Roman quarry on the Mil Palmeras beach
- The beaches of Pilar de la Horadada are spread along five kilometres. They are long with fine and white sand. These beaches are relatively safe places and swimming is permitted in mild conditions. Under the sea, one can see the marine biodiversity and the poseidonia. The quality of these beaches is demonstrated with their Blue Flags. Las Higuericas and Mil Palmeras are two of the most popular beaches in the district.

== Festivals ==
- Festivals in honour of the Blessed Virgin: from 29 September until 30 October. The Floral Tribute (11 October) is one of the highlights alongside the 12th with the Solemn Mass, the procession and "Las carrozas" (one week later).
- Summer festivals: 30 July – Independence from the Orihuela Council (1986).

== History ==
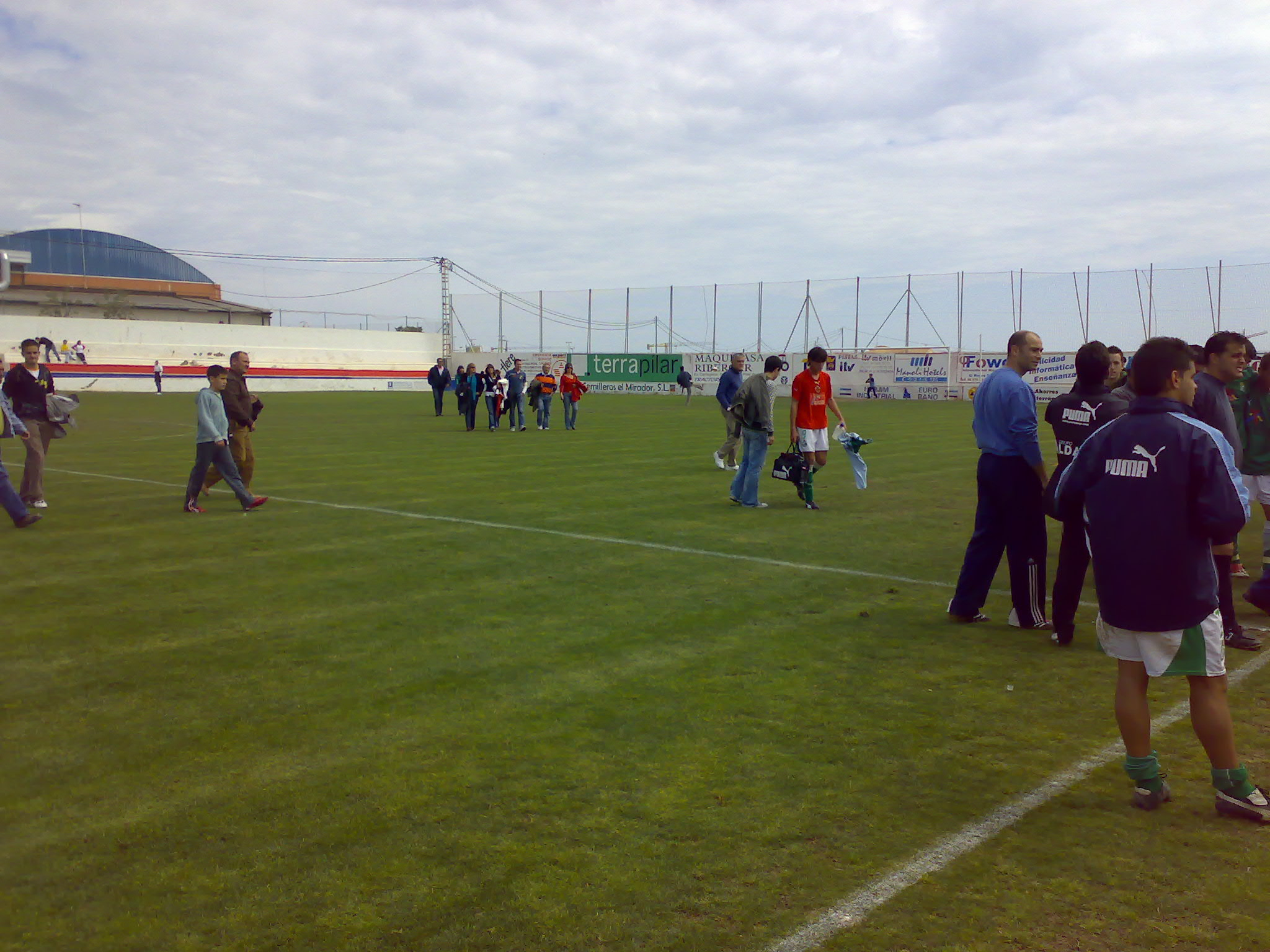
Ikomar Stadium

The town has been the site of many battles because of its location at the historical frontier between two kingdoms: the Kingdom of Murcia (Castilla) and the Kingdom of Valencia. Pilar de la Horadada was a town with dry farms and few houses known as Campo de la Horadada. After various centuries of agricultural economy, its tourism breakthrough came with its independence from the Orihuela municipal district in 1986. Co-operative societies such as 'Surinver' and 'Teresa Hermanos' use many of the local fields for vegetable growing. Pilar de la Horadada lies between the sea and the mountains and has a Mediterranean climate.

== Sports ==
Unión Deportiva Horadada is a football club in Pilar de la Horadada.
