= Campoverde =

Campoverde may refer to:

- Campoverde District, one district within the province of Coronel Portillo in Peru
- Pinar de Campoverde, a small village in the province of Alicante, Spain

== People ==
- Charlie Parra del Riego Campoverde, Peruvian guitarist and composer
- Fernando Carbone Campoverde, a Peruvian medical surgeon
- Marquis of Campoverde, a Spanish military commander during the Peninsular War

== See also ==
- Campo Verde (disambiguation)
