= Ayer Paabas =

Human settlement in Malaysia

- Suburb
- Interactive map of Ayer Paabas
- Coordinates: 2°23′53.5″N 102°10′00.5″E
- Country: Malaysia
- State: Malacca
- Town: Alor Gajah
- District: Alor Gajah

Area
  - Total: 29.96 km^{2} (11.57 sq mi)

Population (2020)
  - Total: 2,526
  - Density: 84.31/km^{2} (218.4/sq mi)
- Time zone: UTC+8 (MST)
  - Summer (DST): Not observed
- Postal code: 78000
- Website: www.mpag.gov.my

Ayer Paabas is a rural town and mukim in Alor Gajah District, Malacca, Malaysia. The town's economy mainly centres on Rubber Plantations, with the town itself surrounded by mostly Rubber Estates.

== Economy ==
- Ayer Paabas Small and Medium Industrial Park

== Education ==
Primary Schools

- Ayer Paabas National Primary School
- Islamic Religious Department Ayer Paabas Religious Primary School

Secondary Schools

- Ayer Paabas MARA Junior Science College

Tertiary Institution

- University College of Agroscience Malaysia (Malay: Kolej Universiti Agrosains Malaysia, UCAM)

== Religious sites ==
- Saga Kariah Mosque
- Sungai Ragok Islamic Cemetery
