= Marcin Pontus =

Polish footballer

Personal information
- Date of birth: 22 September 1985 (age 41)
- Place of birth: Opole, Poland
- Height: 1.94 m (6 ft 4 1/2 in)
- Position: Striker

Youth career
- WSP Wodzisław Śląski
- Baník Ostrava

Senior career*
Years	Team	Apps	(Gls)
2004–2005	Lech Poznań	1	(0)
2005–2006	Horadada	24	(7)
2007	GKS Jastrzębie	10	(4)
2008	Odra Opole	19	(3)
2009	ASIL Lysi	12	(3)
2009–2010	Karviná	18	(2)
2010–2011	Resovia Rzeszów	15	(6)
2011	Bodva Moldava nad Bodvou	2	(0)
2012	ROW Rybnik	11	(2)
2012–2013	Przyszłość Rogów	24	(8)
2013–2014	Stal Bielsko-Biała	26	(8)
2014–2016	Naprzód Syrynia		
- * Club domestic league appearances and goals

Marcin Pontus (born 22 September 1985) is a Polish former professional footballer who played as a striker. Pontus spent most of his career in clubs across Poland, but also featured in Slovakia and the Czech Republic, Cyprus and Spain.

== Career ==
He was a trainee of WSP Wodzisław Śląski, and he signed for Lech Poznań in 2004. Pontus played in Spain for Horadada (Tercera División), before returning to Poland in 2007.
