= Torre de la Horadada =

Town in Alicante, Spain

- Neighbourhood
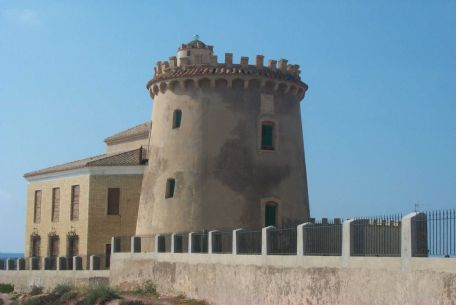
- Torre Foradada, in the municipality of Pilar de la Foradada.

- Flag Coat of arms

- Location within Valencian Community Location within Spain
- Coordinates: 37°52′05″N 0°45′26″W
- Country: Spain
- Autonomous community: Valencian Community
- Province: Alicante
- Comarca: Vega Baja del Segura
- Judicial district: Torrevieja
- Municipality: Pilar de la Horadada

Government
  - Mayor: José Fidel Ros Samper (PP)

Torre de la Horadada is a Spanish town, located on the Mediterranean Sea, with an estimated population of 2,676 inhabitants. It comes under the jurisdiction of Pilar de la Horadada, which in turn has a total population of 22,967, according to the National Statistics Institute. Both of these towns are located in the most southern point of the Alicante province in the southeast of Spain, and therefore share a border with the province of Murcia. The name of the town has its origin in two factors: the first, the 16th century watchtower; and the second, the site where the tower is found: the point of Horadada (el horadada), which comes from the Spanish word for "bore through" as it is situated on rocks made up of small caves, developed by the water boring the rock.

== Historical values ==
In ancient times, the Mediterranean coast, and specifically the Horadada fields suffered many pirate raids. In order to prevent this, Phillip II had a series of watchtowers built along the coast, so that they could alert villagers about the presence of pirate ships. The Horadada tower was built in 1591, although there are traces of the existence of similar constructions from ancient times and the Middle Ages. From 1905 until the present day, it has been property of the counts of Roche, who transformed it into their summer residence. During the 19th century, the tower was used to make signals with an optical telegraph. In December 1995, it was registered as a property of cultural significance within Spain’s Historical Heritage, as a monument.

== Natural values ==
Visitorscan enjoy diving and snorkeling along Torre’s shores full of sea life. Along the coast, great sand banks combined with small rock formations full of marine diversity and posidonia sea grass can be found.

== Present day ==
As a coastal town, it has experienced a deal of its fortune thanks to tourism and boasts various blue flag beaches, some of the most popular being Los Jesuitas, El Conde, and El Puerto. These local beaches are well known for their fine sand and crystal waters. Increased tourism during the busy summer months means that the town’s population can quadruple in size, with many visitors coming from other parts of Spain, mainly Madrid and Murcia, to enjoy their summer residences.

In recent years, Torre de la Horadada has become the home to many expatriate residents form northern Europe, mainly from the UK and Ireland. This has led to the all year round sustainability of the town, which has resulted in the advent of new local business and amenities, such as supermarkets, bars, restaurants and the construction of a new, and modern tourism complex, Lo Monte.

During the Spanish boom years of the first decade of the 21st century, Torre, like many other Spanish coastal towns saw an increase in the construction of homes. However, in contrast to most other local towns, this expansion was characterized for being steady and controlled, which has safeguarded its appearance and the wellbeing of its residents. As a result, Torre has bucked the national trend for the demand of housing, and still continues to have a number of construction projects currently in place, and although house prices have significantly reduced compared to the boom years they still favor considerably in relation to the national trend.

== Amenities ==
Although it’s a small coastal town, Torre boasts various local services such as a medical center, supermarkets and two main plazas, “Pueblo Latino” and “The Square” home to a variety of bars, restaurants and ice cream parlors, meaning that all tastes and budgets are catered for.

The town is also home to a marina of 525 moorings, which was built on a small fishing dock more than 30 years ago, and has recently been a point of conflict between residents and authorities, due to a proposed expansion of the port, which would endanger certain aspects of the environment, as well as a negative visual impact.

As of June 2011, Torre is now home to a modest modern tourism complex, Lo Monte, which has three swimming pools, a gym, a spa, and a bar/restaurant, which provides local delicacies, as well as international cuisine, to both tourists and local residents. All the facilities are managed with the maximum respect for the environment, and are adapted for children and disabled people. This complex adds to the touristic viability of the town, offering cozy wooden bungalows as well as plots to rent.

Also, there is a Guardia Civil barracks located next to the famous watchtower, from which the town takes its name.
