= Sucina =

Town in the Region of Murcia, Spain

Sucina is a town belonging to the municipality of Murcia in the Region of Murcia, located in Campo de Murcia, in the Huerta de Murcia Region (although it is also included in the Campo de Cartagena agrarian region), in southeastern Spain. The town is 29 kilometers from Murcia and 15 kilometers northwest of San Javier. The town has a population of 2,098 inhabitants (INE 2019) and an area of 65,361 km^{2}.

== Amenities ==
Plaza Arteaga is considered the town centre. The church here, ‘Nuestra Señora del Rosario', has been renovated due to its age. Around the plaza are a bank and five bars and restaurants. During the annual fiestas a stage is erected on one side of the plaza and people gather to watch live entertainment.

Outside of the plaza the town boasts several other bars, cafes and restauarants, a health centre, dental surgery, veterinarian centre, supermarkets, a second bank, a petrol station, tobacconist, and a kiosk selling snacks such as crisps, salted popcorn (palomitas – little doves or pigeons if you prefer), and sunflower seeds.

Sucina has two town halls. The older one is deep in the old town. Inside is a small theatre and a hairdresser, plus information regarding activities, courses, and events. Outside the town hall is a play area for children and benches where the older townsfolk seek refuge from the sun under the shade of the trees, keeping guard whilst the children play. A small platform stage can also be found outside the Ayuntamiento, where the steps of the town hall are utilised as makeshift seats, for any outdoor staged events.

== History ==
Around the 16th or 17th century, Murcia’s countryside population began to grow. Sucina’s appointment was known as ‘El Pozo de Sucina’, translated as ‘Sucina’s Well’ and also known as Cañada de Sucina – Sucina's canyons.

During the Liberal Triennium (1820–1823) Sucina managed to become an independent municipality, including in its municipal term Balsicas (de Arriba), Cañadas de San Pedro, Gea and Truyols, Cabezo de la Plata (which is currently in the district of Cañadas de San Pedro) and Jerónimo y Avileses. However, in 1823 it returned to depend on the Murcia City Council.

At the beginning of the 18th century during Murcia's agricultural period, Sucina was a dependent town within Murcia's jurisdiction. Shortly thereafter, a local parish in Sucina was formed in 1744 by Don Balthazar Artega y Gamba, with the parish represented by a priest from La Orden de Los Clérigos Menores (The order of the young clergy), Don Juan Matheo. In 1768, 919 parishioners were recorded. In the early 19th century, between 1820 and 1823, Sucina's Ayuntamiento was erected. Around this era, construction was underway for the inhabitants of the town, whereby 50 terraced houses were built including 400 semi-detached homes, purely for the town's labourers.

== Geography ==
The land is dry with no river or lake nearby. Therefore, the source of water is rain.

The village limits with:

- northwest: Cañadas de San Pedro
- northeast: the municipality of Orihuela
- west: Gea and Truyols
- southwest: Jerónimo and Avileses
- south: the municipality of San Javier

== Economy ==
Produce, such as almonds, olives, wheat, artichokes, green beans, melons, lemons and tomatoes are grown there for export. These products are the main agricultural activity. Their biggest commercial enterprise is the cultivation, transport and export of almonds. Wildlife such as fowl and rabbits are scattered about these lands also claiming this region as their own.

== Demographics ==
In the 20th century, Sucina witnessed vast changes, especially from its population decline. Its 1,714 inhabitants in 1960 declined to 1,005 by 1970 and in 1991 to 985. However, in 1996 the population recovered to 1,054.

== Gallery ==
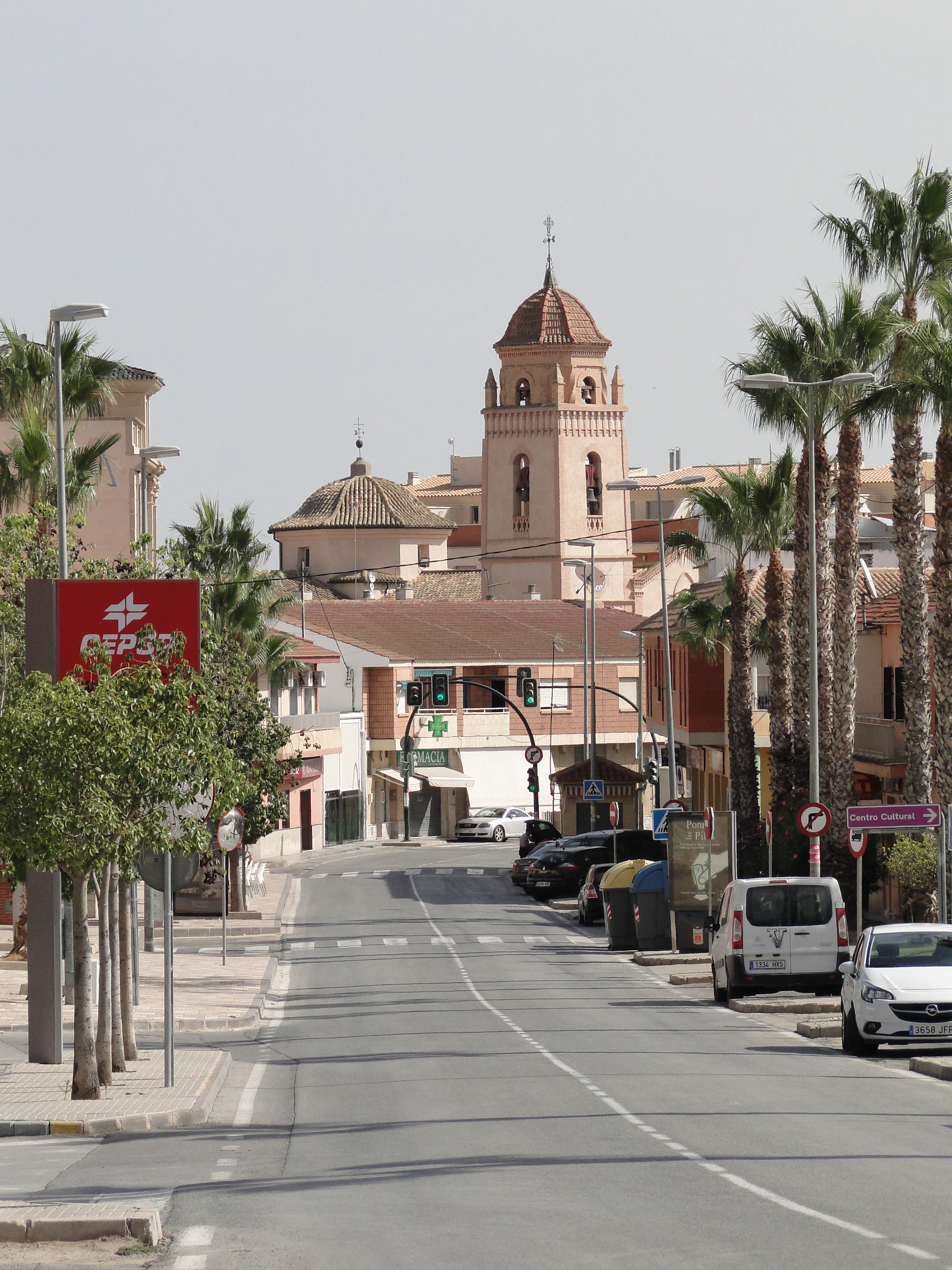

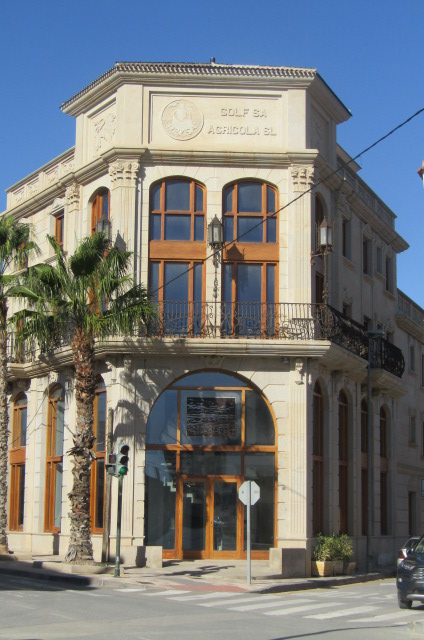
