= University College of Agroscience Malaysia =

Private university in Malaysia

- Kolej Universiti Agrosains Malaysia
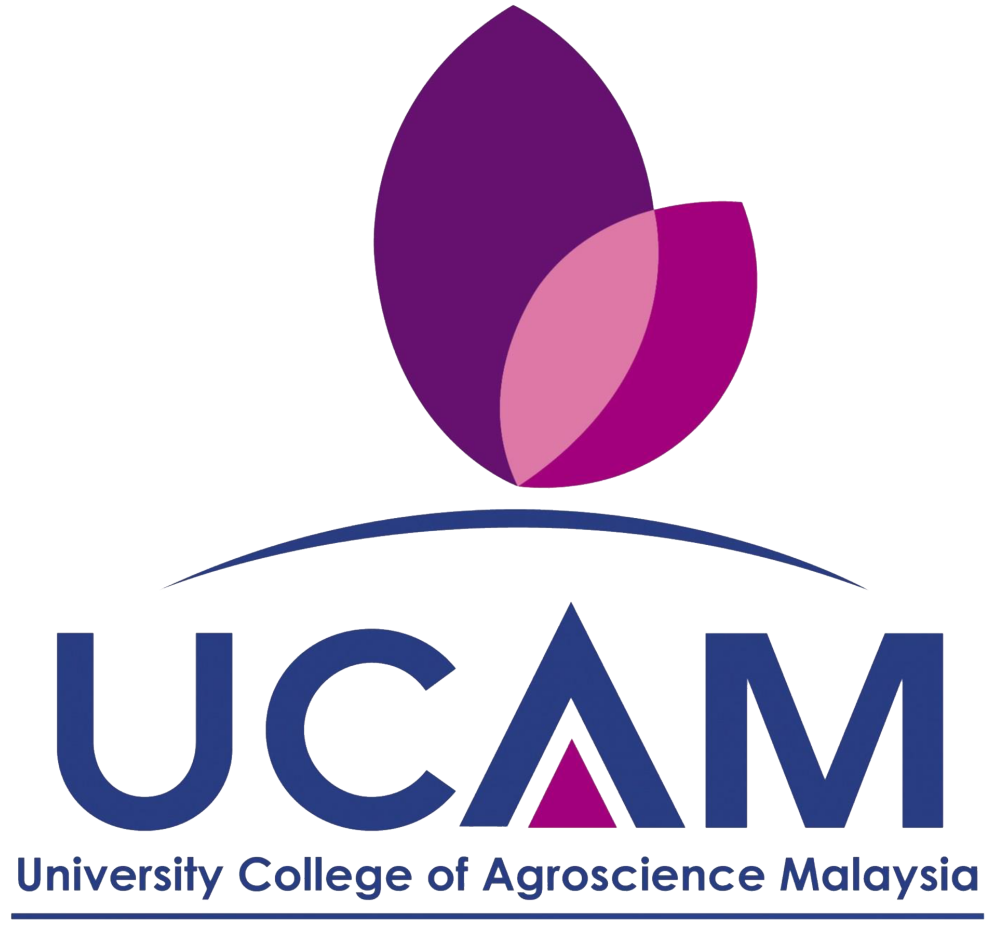
- Former names: Rubber Training School (1960–1973); RISDA Training School (1973–1980); RISDA Training Institute (1980–1999); RISDA College (1999–2014)
- Motto: Membentuk Tunas Cemerlang (Malay)
- Motto in English: Shaping the Seeds of Excellence
- Type: Private
- Established: 8 January 1999; 27 years ago
- Parent institution: RISDA Holdings
- Accreditation: Malaysian Qualifications Agency
- Affiliations: Rubber Industry Smallholders Development Authority (RISDA)
- Chairman: Rubiah Wang
- Rector: Rossly Salleh
- Academic staff: 500
- Students: ~15,000
- Location: Alor Gajah, Malacca, Malaysia
- Campus: Urban
- Language: Malay (primary); English (secondary)
- Colours: Patriarch, Pink, Deep Purple and Trypan Blue
- Website: www.ucam.edu.my

The University College of Agroscience Malaysia (UCAM; Malay: Kolej Universiti Agrosains Malaysia) is a private university of Malaysia based in Alor Gajah, Malacca. Established in 1999 as the RISDA College (Malay: Kolej RISDA), it upgraded into a university college status and took its present name in 2014. It is owned and operated by the Rubber Industry Smallholders Development Authority (RISDA), through its wholly-owned subsidiary, RISDA Holdings.

== History ==
UCAM traced its origins to the 1960 with the establishment of the Rubber Industry Training School under the Rubber Research Institute of Malaya (RRI). Upon its establishment in 1973, the Rubber Industry Smallholders Development Authority (RISDA) took over the school and rebranded it as the RISDA Training School. It then became RISDA Training Institute in 1980 and functioned as the institution to conduct management and technical training as well as outreach program for smallholders who receive funds from RISDA.

On 8 January 1999, RISDA Training Institute was upgraded into a college status and renamed as RISDA College and registered under the Private Higher Education Institutions Act 1996. In 2006, RISDA College offered academic study programs at certificate and diploma levels.

RISDA College was uprgraded into a university college status and renamed as the University College of Agroscience Malaysia (UCAM) on 8 December 2014.

== Campuses and faculties ==
UCAM's main campus is situated at an agricultural land approximately 60.7 hectares and 150 acres in Ayer Paabas, covering five zones: Administrative, Academic, Plantation, Residential College and Sports and Recreation. It also has 4 other campus branches in Perak, Pahang, Kelantan and Sabah. It currently has three faculties:

- Faculty of Agroscience (Fakulti Agrosains)
- Faculty of Business Management (Fakulti Pengurusan Perniagaan)
- Faculty of Social Science and Information Technology (Fakulti Sains Sosial dan Teknologi Maklumat)

== See also ==
- List of universities in Malaysia
