= Campo Verde Solar Project =

Power station in Imperial County, California

- Country: United States
- Location: California
- Coordinates: 32°45′N 115°43′W
- Status: Operational
- Owners: Southern Power and Turner Renewable Energy

Solar farm
- Type: Flat-panel PV

Power generation
- Nameplate capacity: 139 MW_{AC} 161 MW_{DC}
- Annual net output: 371 GW·h

Campo Verde Solar Project is a 139-megawatt (MW_{AC}) solar photovoltaic power station in Imperial County, California. The project was approved in December 2012. Construction began in early 2013 and was completed the same year. Designed and constructed by U.S. thin-film manufacturer First Solar, the plant uses nearly 2.3 million CdTe-PV modules. Campo Verde Solar was acquired in April 2013 by Southern Power and Turner Renewable Energy. First Solar acquired the project in 2012 from US Solar Holdings LLC, which had developed the project and negotiated the 139 MW PPA with SDG&E.

== Production ==
Generation (MW·h) of Campo Verde Solar
Year	Jan	Feb	Mar	Apr	May	Jun	Jul	Aug	Sep	Oct	Nov	Dec	Total
2013									9,726	14,493	27,200	25,990	77,409
2014	26,657	24,886	33,926	34,070	36,092	35,394	33,951	33,602	32,892	30,600	28,590	20,637	371,297
2015	24,232	28,337	33,181	34,523	35,314	32,245	33,610	34,028	29,369	29,805	28,121	26,168	368,933
2016	24,555	30,360	33,098	33,139	36,543	33,713	33,633	32,376	29,652	30,419	24,695	20,144	362,327
Total													1,179,966

== See also ==
- Solar power in California
- List of photovoltaic power stations
