= Santiago y Zaraíche =

- Interactive map of Santiago y Zaraíche
- Coordinates: 38.006°N 1.128°W
- Country: Spain
- Province: Murcia
- Municipality: Murcia
- Elevation: 39 m (128 ft)

Population (2007)
  - Total: 5,355

Santiago y Zaraíche is a village and a district in Murcia, Spain. It is part of the municipality of Murcia. It has an area of 1.266 kilometres (0.787 mi)^{2} and shares borders with the main city by its south. 10,791 people lived in the district in 2020.
