= Pinar de Campoverde =

- Municipality
- Motto: Mar y Montaña (Sea and Mountains)
- Location in Spain
- Coordinates: 37°54′00″N 0°50′30″W
- Country: Spain
- Autonomous community: Valencian Community
- Province: Alacant
- Comarca: Vega Baja del Segura
  - Alcalde: (PP)

Area
  - Total: 3 km^{2} (1.2 sq mi)
- Elevation: 160 m (520 ft)

Population
  - Total: 3,000
  - Density: 1,000/km^{2} (2,600/sq mi)
- (approx.)
- Time zone: UTC+1 (CET)
  - Summer (DST): UTC+2 (CEST)
- Postal code: 03191
- Official language(s): Spanish
- Website: Official website

Pinar de Campoverde (Pine Forest in/of the Green Field literally) is a small village located at the foot of the Sierra de Escalona mountain range, within the Pilar de la Horadada municipality in the province of Alicante, Spain.

== History ==
The town has only developed since the mid-1980s when many British, German, French and Scandinavian expatriates settled in villas. Originally, the area had been a large pine forest, next to the Río Seco river and had little agricultural importance until much of the wooded area was cleared for orange and lemon groves. The name Pinar de Campoverde or Pinar de Campo Verde derives from the fact that the area was once pine woodland (Pinar) and its impression on its first residents was a 'green field' (Campo Verde).

== Population and area ==
The town had around 5,000 residents in 2026 and is ten kilometres from the Mediterranean coastline.

Since the recent advent of tourism, the majority of the population are expatriates, mainly from the United Kingdom and Germany. The traditional centre of the village is based on the two kilometre long Avenida del Pino which runs from the main Pilar de la Horadada-Orihuela road to the municipal sports fields (Polideportivo) at the Río Seco. This strip has numerous bars and restaurants, estate agents and shops. There is also a medical centre, dentist and veterinarian. On Sunday there is a small street market held in the centre of the village, close to the free car park.

The 'New' area, located to the west of the village has been in construction since the late 1990s and is almost exclusively inhabited by foreigners (although a few Spanish families do live amongst them). There is a second commercial area at the top of the village with a pharmacy and a few bars and shops, which have views across the countryside. Having been built on the side of the Rio Seco (dry river), the residential areas tend to be rather hilly and the 'old' area has very narrow footpaths in places. The Parque Central (Central Park) is located here.
