= Jerónimo y Avileses =

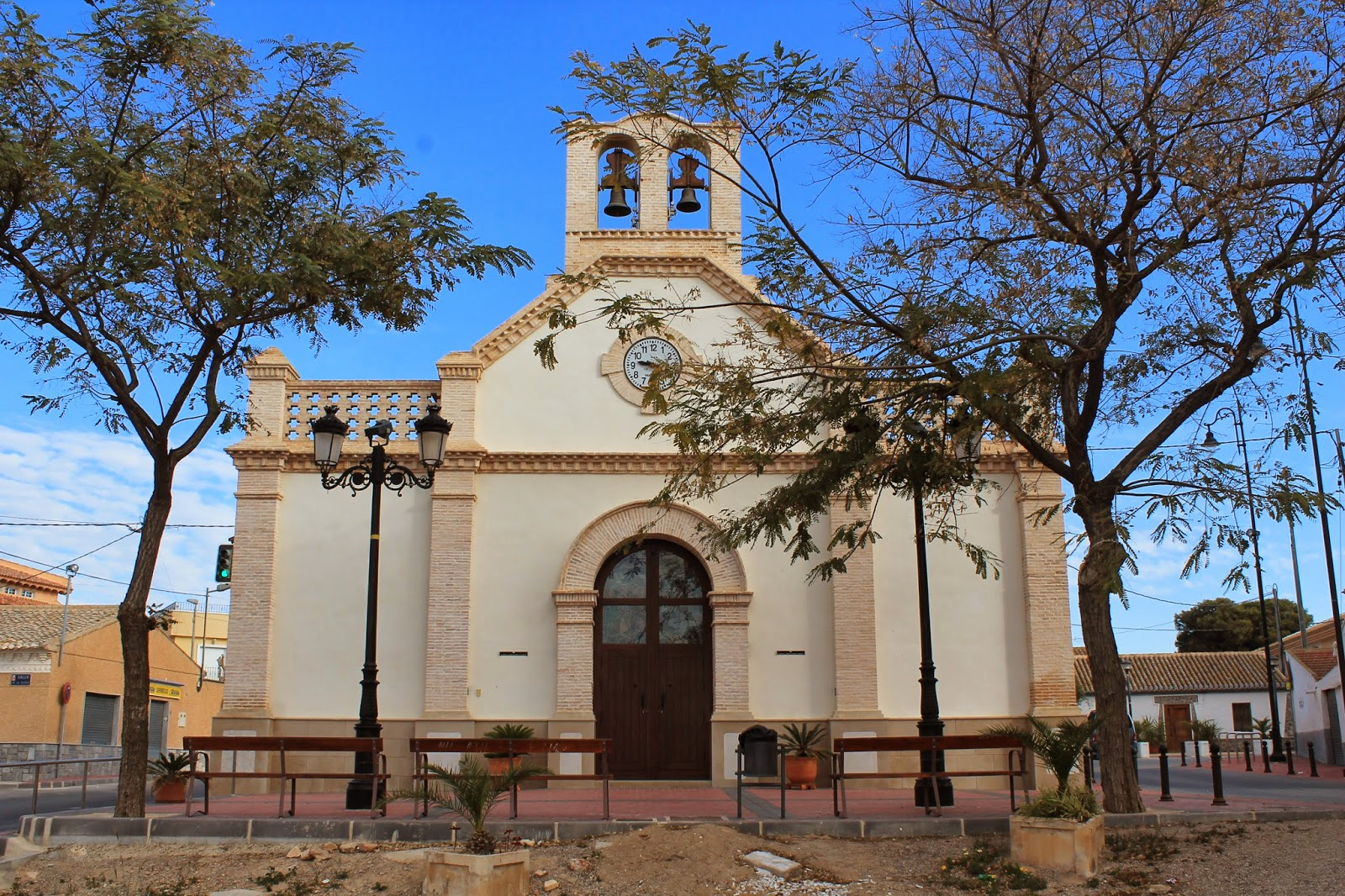
- Interactive map of Jerónimo y Avileses
- Coordinates: 37.848°N 0.946°W
- Country: Spain
- Province: Murcia
- Municipality: Murcia

Area
  - Total: 39.437 km^{2} (15.227 sq mi)
- Elevation: 115 m (377 ft)

Population (2004)
  - Total: 1,126
- Postal code: 303592

Jerónimo y Avileses is a village and a district in Murcia, Spain. It is part of the municipality of Murcia and is located in the south-east of the municipality. It has an area of 39.437 km^{2} and had a population of 1,701 in 2020.

== Demographics ==
51.028% inhabitants are foreigners – 27.92% come from other country of Europe, 20.81% are Africans, 2.116% are Americans and 0.176% are Asians. The table below shows the population trends in the 21st century by its five-year periods.

| | 2001 | 2006 | 2011 | 2016 |
|---|---|---|---|---|
| Population | 821 | 1160 | 1429 | 1418 |
