= Murcia–San Javier Airport =

Murcia–San Javier Airport Aeropuerto de Murcia-San Javier
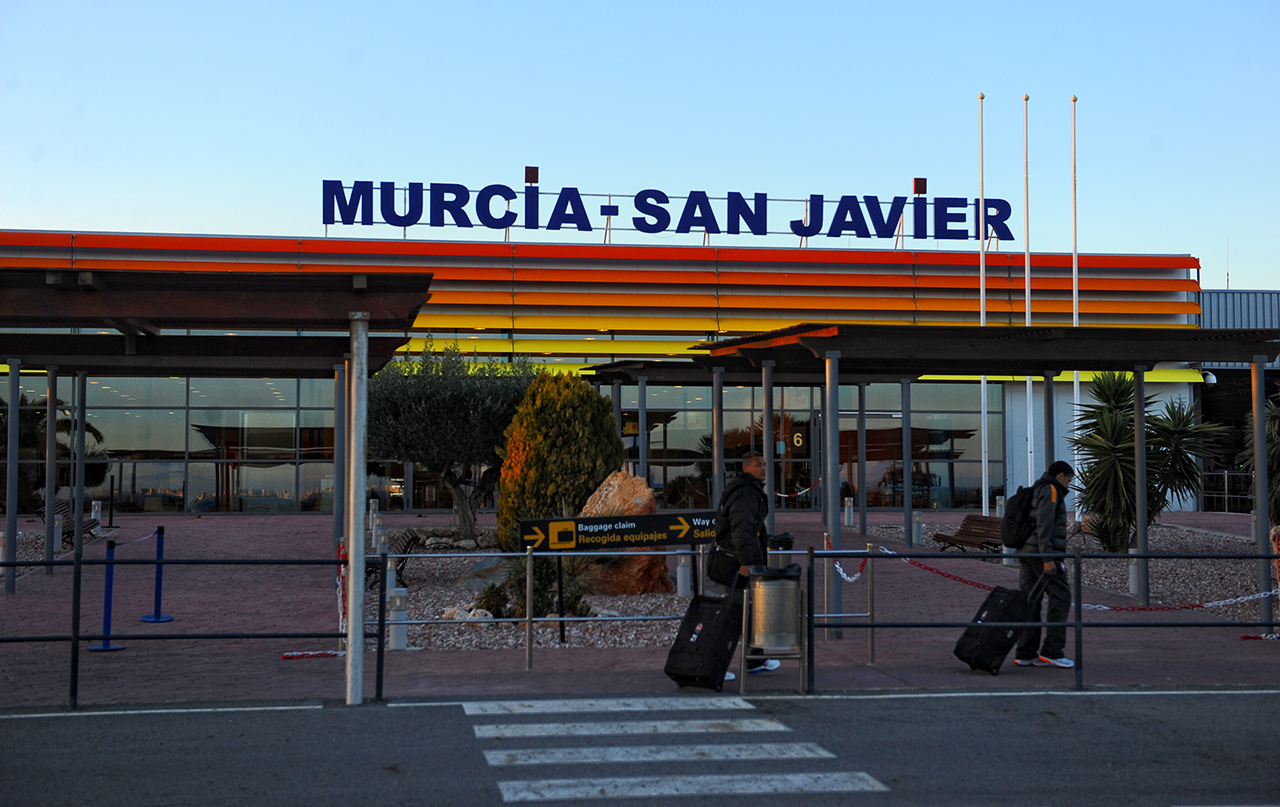
- IATA: none; ICAO: LELC

Summary
- Airport type: Military
- Owner: Spanish Air and Space Force
- Serves: Region of Murcia and Alicante
- Location: San Javier, Murcia
- Passenger services ceased: 14 January 2019
- Elevation AMSL: 11 ft / 3.4 m
- Coordinates: 37°46′29″N 000°48′44″W

Map
- Location within Spain

Runways
Direction	Length		Surface
Direction	m	ft	Surface
05R/23L	2,300	7,546	Asphalt
05L/23R	1,580	5,184	Asphalt

Statistics (2016)
- Passengers: 1,096,980
- Passengers change 15-16: ▲2.7%
- Movements: 8,272
- Movements change 15-16: ▼3.2%
- Sources: Aena

Murcia–San Javier Airport (ICAO: LELC) is a military airport and former civilian passenger airport located in San Javier, 26 miles (42 km) southeast of Murcia, Spain. It is owned by the Spanish Air and Space Force. It was replaced (after several delays) by the new Región de Murcia International Airport, when it opened on 15 January 2019.

== Overview ==
=== Operations ===
The airport can handle aircraft up to the size of a Boeing 757. It has Category 5 fire cover by the IATA, and also has one ambulance available.

The military air base dates back to at least the early 1930s and is located at the northern end of the airport. It is used chiefly by Spanish Air and Space Force turboprop, piston and jet-engined training aircraft of the Academia General del Aire (the Spanish Air Force College), including the aerobatic demonstration team of the Spanish Air and Space Force Patrulla Águila which can often be seen practicing over the nearby Mar Menor.

In recent years, Murcia Airport became much busier thanks to the arrival of several low-cost airlines. According to Aena, passenger numbers jumped from 88,608 in 1995 to 1,181,490 passengers in 2012.

=== Replacement ===
The airport invested in a new €60 million runway and terminal buildings around 2004 to 2011 In November 2011, the Minister of Public Works Antonio Sevilla, and Secretary of State for Transport Isaías Táboas, signed an official agreement that effectively proposed to close the airport to civilian air traffic from 2012.

In November 2017, the Spanish government said it would be awarding AENA the contract of managing Corvera Airport - whereby San Javier would be closed and flights transferred. In April 2018, it was confirmed that the new Región de Murcia International Airport, which is situated in closer proximity to the city of Murcia, would open in January 2019. San Javier closed on 14 January 2019 and all airlines transferred their services to the new airport the following day. The final flight to operate at San Javier was Ryanair flight FR4117 to Manchester.

== Airlines and destinations ==
All operations transferred to Región de Murcia International Airport on 14 January 2019. At the time of its closure, ten airlines were operating at the airport, flying to various destinations across Europe. Most passengers on these routes were tourists whose main destinations were the coasts of the Region of Murcia and southern Alicante, as well as the cities of Murcia and Cartagena. Previously, there had been daily flights to Madrid–Barajas, which was the airport’s only domestic connection.

The destinations listed below were operated from San Javier during its final year of service, 2018. All airlines transferred their flights to the new Region of Murcia International Airport, with the exception of British Airways and Aer Lingus, which cancelled their routes. In addition, Ryanair ended its connections to Frankfurt and Eindhoven, while Jet2.com stopped flying to Edinburgh and Newcastle.
