= Cañadas de San Pedro =

- Interactive map of Cañadas de San Pedro
- Coordinates: 37.980°N 0.992°W
- Country: Spain
- Province: Murcia
- Municipality: Murcia

Population (2004)
  - Total: 310

Cañadas de San Pedro is a village in the Region of Murcia, Spain. It is part of the municipality of Murcia.
