= Los Dolores de Beniaján =

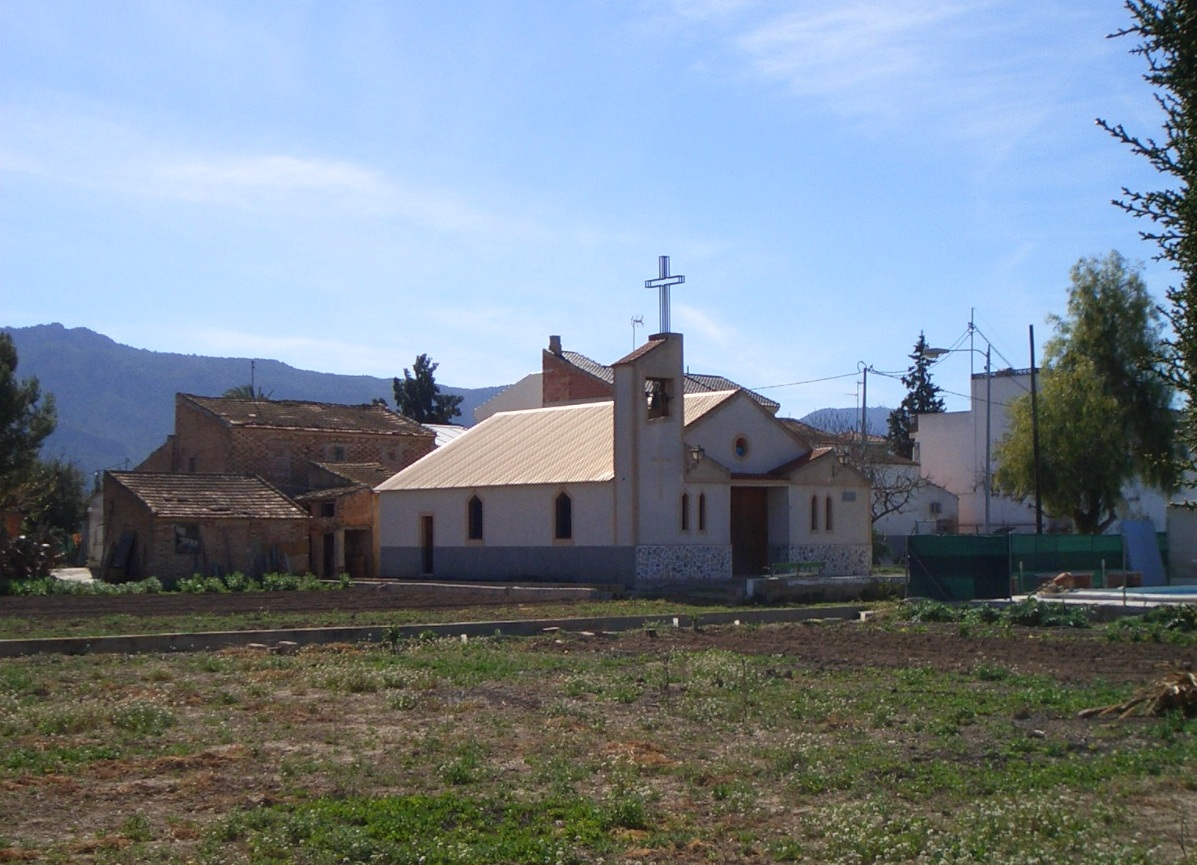
- Interactive map of Los Dolores de Beniaján
- Country: Spain
- Province: Murcia
- Municipality: Murcia

Population (2015)
  - Total: 4,707

Los Dolores de Beniaján is a village in Murcia, Spain. It is part of the municipality of Murcia.
