= Llano de Brujas =

- Location in Spain
- Coordinates: 38.006°N 1.071°W
- Country: Spain
- Province: Murcia
- Municipality: Murcia
- Elevation: 39 m (128 ft)

Population (2015)
  - Total: 5,763

Llano de Brujas is a district in Murcia, Spain. It is part of the municipality of Murcia and it is located in the northeastern quarter. This district has an area of 7.3 km^{2} and was inhabited by 5,830 people in 2020.

There is a documentary reference about a hamlet in the district which dates back to 1736.

The territory hosts two localities: Huerta de Llano de Bruja, which has a population of 2,572 in 2020, and El Salar, where 3,258 people lived in the same year.

== Demographics ==
9.67% inhabitants are foreigners – 2.39% come from other country of Europe, 4.35% are Africans, 2.71% are Americans, and 12 Asian people reside in the territory. The table below shows the population trends of the district.

	1970	1996	2000	2005	2010	2015
Population	3,181	4,093	4,305	5,050	5,677	5,673

== Festivities ==
- Carnival
- Patron saint festivity
