= Los Martínez del Puerto =

- Location in Spain Los Martínez del Puerto (Spain)
- Coordinates: 37.818°N 1.078°W
- Country: Spain
- Province: Murcia
- Municipality: Murcia

Area
  - Total: 29.625 km^{2} (11.438 sq mi)

Population (2005)
  - Total: 1,392

Position of the district in the municipality Murcia.

Los Martínez del Puerto is a village in Murcia, Spain. It is part of the municipality of Murcia.

== Geography ==
This territory has approximately an area of 29.645 km2. It has a border with the municipality of Torre-Pacheco at the East and at the South. There is distance of 24 km to the capital of the municipality (the city of Murcia).

== History ==
This territory had been an arid and dry area which was just occupied with a few houses since ancient times. In the Roman Hispania era, this current district was known by the people as a 'esparto grass fields' due to the large presence of this species in this area.

Evidences of this Roman presence is the archaeological site named 'Villa romana de San Esteban' (translated as 'Roman villa of Saint Stephen').

A settlement by the Muslim settlers took place in the Islamic Hispania era in this territory. The date is from the 8th to 10th century.

The Arabs also left archaeological remains, in particular, some farmhouses and isolated Arab living buildings named in Spanish 'rafales'.

In the years 1238 to 1243 the Muslim kingdom of Murcia was more and more compelled by the powerful kingdoms of Castile, Aragón and Granada. There was also a very unstable inner situation. The king Ibn Hud decided to vassalage Castille. Therefore, the Castilian and Christian kingdom and its king Alfonso X of Castile, took the power of the former Taifa of Murcia, which became the Kingdom of Murcia.

In this century, the origin of the village Los Martínez del Puerto occurred. It consisted in the fact that a noble family surnamed Los Martínez got a medieval and modern-aged ownership rights and legal recognition of this kind of ownership named mayorazgo of the lands of this current district.

Los Martínez del Puerto had its own parish building for its first time in the year 1892.

== Main sights ==
Notable buildings according to their historic and artistic values are listed below:

- La Chitina Country Estate
- Lo Campuzano Shrine

== Festivities ==
- Nuestra Señora de las Maravillas Festivity: This festivity was consecrated to the village patroness saint of Las Maravillas (literally translated as 'The Wonder') in its origins. It is held at the weekends of June.
- Saint John's Eve Festivity: This festivity is held in the East of the Iberian Peninsula. The main activities of this festivity are making a big bonfire where people gather around and lightning several kinds of lightcrackers.
