= Barrio del Progreso =

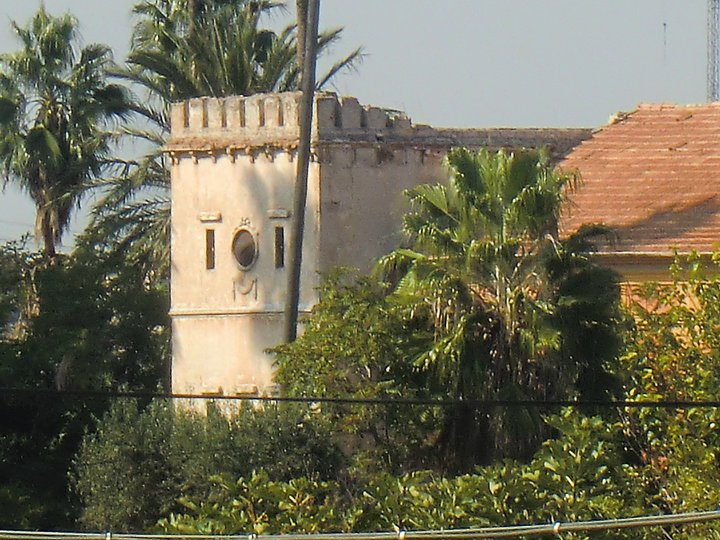
- Interactive map of Barrio del Progreso
- Coordinates: 37°57′54″N 1°07′11″W
- Country: Spain
- Province: Murcia
- Municipality: Murcia

Population (2015)
  - Total: 5,320

Barrio del Progreso is a village in Murcia, Spain. It is part of the municipality of Murcia.
