= El Raal =

Coordinates: 38°02′N 1°01′W

- Interactive map of El Raal
- Country: Spain
- Province: Murcia
- Municipality: Murcia
- Elevation: 31 m (102 ft)

Population (2013)
  - Total: 6,211

El Raal is a village and a district in Murcia, Spain. It is part of the municipality of Murcia.

== Geography ==
This territory is located in the North of the region (comarca) Huerta de Murcia and also in a pre-coastal depression of Region of Murcia. The district has a distance of 10.8 km from the capital of the municipality (the city of Murcia).

== History ==
There is no evidence about the presence of human beings in before the Middle Ages in this territory.

The history of El Raal was very related to the Segura River and the irrigation canals.

The first document references about this area have their dates in the years 1257 and 1271.

In the Modern Age there are references about this district and their concrete date is the year 1452. This consisted of a tax collection.

During the Trienio Liberal (1820-1823) El Raal reached in establishing its own local government and the name of the municipality was 'Villa Constitucional de El Raal de Teatinos'. This status endured three years.

In the 20th century, there was a large increase in population. There were 1,559 inhabitants in the district in the year 1900. Forty years later its population was 3,367. There were 5,171 inhabitants in the year 1963. There was a drop in population from that year, and the number of residents in the year 1972 was 3958. There was again an increase in population from that year, and there were 5,132 people living in El Raal in the year 1996.

== Demographics ==
19.538% are foreigners – 4.87% come from other countries of Europe, 12.9% are Africans, 1.55% are Americans and 0.2% are Asians. The table below shows the population trends during the 21st century by its five-year periods.

	2001	2006	2011	2016
Population	5,321	5,639	6,379	6,315
