= Rincón de Beniscornia =

- Location in Spain
- Coordinates: 37.985°N 1.176°W
- Country: Spain
- Province: Murcia
- Municipality: Murcia
- Elevation: 50 m (160 ft)

Population (2010)
  - Total: 882

Rincón de Beniscornia is a village in Murcia, Spain. It is part of the municipality of Murcia.
