= Zarandona =

Coordinates: 38°00′N 1°06′W

- Interactive map of Zarandona
- Country: Spain
- Province: Murcia
- Municipality: Murcia

Population (2021)
  - Total: 7,020

Zarandona is a village in Murcia, Spain. It is part of the municipality of Murcia.
