= Nonduermas =

- Location in Spain
- Coordinates: 37.972°N 1.172°W
- Country: Spain
- Province: Murcia
- Municipality: Murcia

Population (2015)
  - Total: 2,332

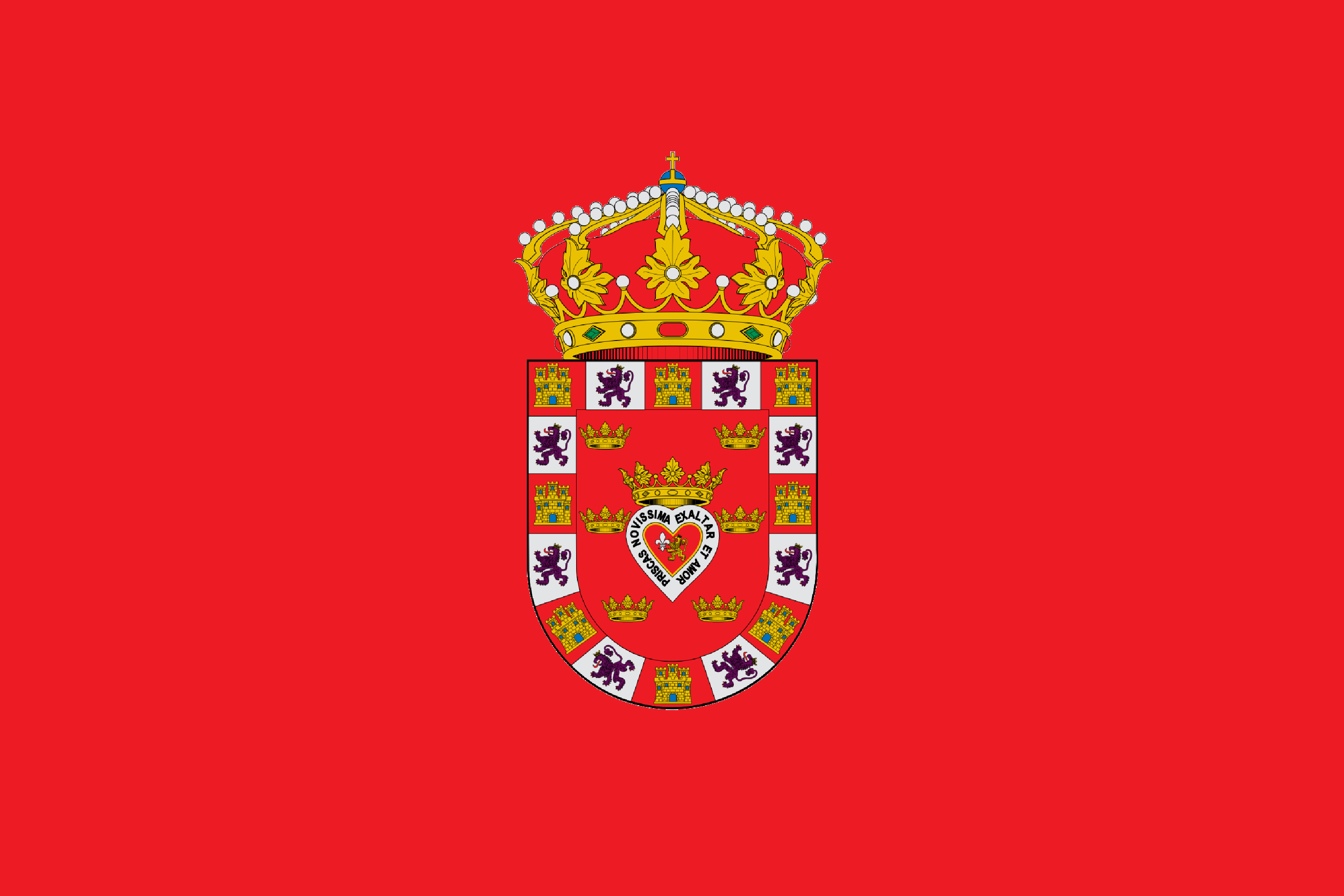
Flag of Murcia 2.0

Nonduermas is a village and a district in Murcia, Spain. It is part of the municipality of Murcia.

== Etymology ==
Unlike other districts of the region (comarca) Huerta de Murcia and belonging to the municipality of Murcia, the Arab toponym of the territory did not persist.

This toponym has a previous historically Spanish variant origin (related to the Spanish language spoken in previous eras). 'Nonduermas' is composed by two words: the grammar negator word of a previous historically Spanish variant 'non' and the word 'duermas', which is the verb 'dormir' conjugated, and it means 'to sleep'. Therefore, this expression is negative imperative and it can be translated as 'Don't sleep' or 'Do not sleep'.

The reason for this district name is just hypothesized. One hypothesis is about the toponym to have its origins in the fact that a kind of neighbouring assembly medieval government named concejo, established that the meadows of the territory could be place for traffic for the local shepherds and the foreign shepherds must have been allowed for staying at the territory. Another action of the concejo related to the issue of those meadows was the instructions with the message that lighting camp fires was forbidden. Otherwise the shepherds would be fined. The consequences of that legal regulation and the fines would be the warning 'Non duermas' (Don't sleep). Other hypothesis is related to the danger in travelling through a path, so the locals used to warn the people who were intending to circulate through that path with the expression 'Non duermas'. A third hyphotesis establishes the origin of this toponym in the fact that a group of Christian knights were sent by the king James I of Aragon from Orihuela. They were attack by Muslim forces and the commander of the Christian party advertised this Christian knight group with the expression 'Non duermas'.

== Geography ==
The area of this district is approximately 2.755 km^{2} and its height is around 50 metres. There is a distance of 3 km from the village to the capital of the municipality (the city of Murcia).

== History ==
A farmstead whose name is Tel Açaguer or Tell Açegir is theorized to exist in the last half of the 13th century in this current district. In that era, large part of the Iberian Peninsula was governed by Muslim governments due to a Muslim conquer of the peninsula during the 8th century.

During the Trienio Liberal (1820–1823), an own local government was established in Non Duermas.

There was a constant population growth during the 20th century in this territory.

== Festivities ==
- Fiestas patronales (Patron saint festivities) in honour of the patroness saint de Cortes: This festivity is held on the first weeks of September. During these festive days some acts such as masses, triduums and flowers offerings to the Virgin are conducted. Other phenomena in this festive ambient are the choirs and the popular dances. There are also acts for young people such as hip hop performances and festive races. In rigard to the children, there are children theatre performances, amusement rides and a temporary outdoor cinema space avoidable for them.
