= Baños y Mendigo =

- Location in Spain
- Coordinates: 37.87°N 1.13°W
- Country: Spain
- Province: Murcia
- Municipality: Murcia

Population (2015)
  - Total: 540

Baños y Mendigo is a village and a district in Murcia, Spain. It is part of the municipality of Murcia and is located in the southern half. The district has an area of 59.275 km^{2} and was inhabited by 772 people in 2020.

== Demographics ==
57.12% are foreigners – 34.71% come from other country of Europe, 14.248% are Africans, 3.88% are Americans and 0.388 are Asians. The table below shows the population trends in the 21st century by its five-year periods.

	2001	2006	2011	2016
Population	277	406	584	579
