= El Palmar, Murcia =

Coordinates: 37.9422°N 1.1614°W

El Palmar
- Interactive map of El Palmar
- Country: Spain
- Province: Murcia
- Municipality: Murcia

Area
  - Total: 26.039 km^{2} (10.054 sq mi)
- Elevation: 67 m (220 ft)

Population (2015)
  - Total: 22,897

El Palmar is a village and pedanía (district) belonging to the municipality of Murcia, in the Region of Murcia, Spain. 24,266 people resided in the territory in 2020.

== Origin of Name ==
There are two hypotheses about the district name. According to the first, the name is due to the presence of palm trees and European fan palms. The other hypothesis is that the name derives from El Palomar, a name that appears in historic documents of the 16th century, as the origin of the toponym.

== Geography ==
El Palmar is situated in the foothills of the Puerto de la Cadena mountain pass and is 5 km from the capital of the municipality (the city of Murcia).

== History ==
There is evidence of the Roman presence in this territory in the Roman Hispanian era. The evidence consists of the archaeological remains of a Roman hamlet whose date is the 2nd century BC.

During the Middle Ages a castle named La Asomada was built in the 12th century.

As a result of the population increase in the 17th century the locality obtained the status of the villa.

As the Spanish Constitution of 1812 came into effect, the current district obtained its own status as a municipality. When the king Ferdinand VII recovered the crown, this status was removed. The district recovered this during the Trienio Liberal (1820–1823). When that period ended, El Palmar returned to belonging to Murcia.

== Demographics ==
18.22% inhabitants are foreigners – 1.72% come from another European country, 13.72% are Africans, 2.3% are Americans, and 0.47% are Asians. The table below shows the population trends of the territory.

	1996	2000	2005	2010	2015
Population	15,842	16,184	19,399	23,025	22,897

== Main sights ==
- La Asomada castle: this consists of the ruins of a former castle. It was probably built in the 12th century.
- Los Bernal modernist building: this was built in the early 20th century.
- Bernal Theatre: this was constructed in 1910 and restored in 2003.

== People ==
- Carlos Alcaraz, professional tennis player
