= Valladolises y Lo Jurado =

- Interactive map of Valladolises y Lo Jurado
- Country: Spain
- Province: Murcia
- Municipality: Murcia
- Elevation: 162 m (531 ft)

Population (2015)
  - Total: 692

Valladolises y Lo Jurado is a village and a district in Murcia, Spain. It is part of the municipality of Murcia. Valladolises y Lo Jurado is located in the south end and shares borders with Fuente Álamo de Murcia in its south. The district has an area of 42.614 km^{2} and was inhabited by 775 people in 2020.

== Demographics ==
38.27% inhabitants are foreigners – 2.448% come from other country of Europe, 27.34% are Africans, and 8.21% are Americans. The table below shows the population trends of the Valladolises y Lo Jurado in the 21st century by its five-year periods.

| | 2001 | 2006 | 2011 | 2016 |
|---|---|---|---|---|
| Population | 783 | 710 | 727 | 683 |
