= Al-Qasr al-Sagir =

Coordinates: 37.9881°N 1.1304°W

The Al-Qasr al-Sagir (Alcázar Menor), is former Muslim palace from the 13th century in Arrixaca, a northern suburb of Murcia, Spain. The site is now occupied by a Poor Clare convent. It is one of the most historically significant buildings in the city, containing remains of the Arab palace, which are among the most important examples of Islamic art in Murcia.

== Dar As-Sugra (12th century) ==
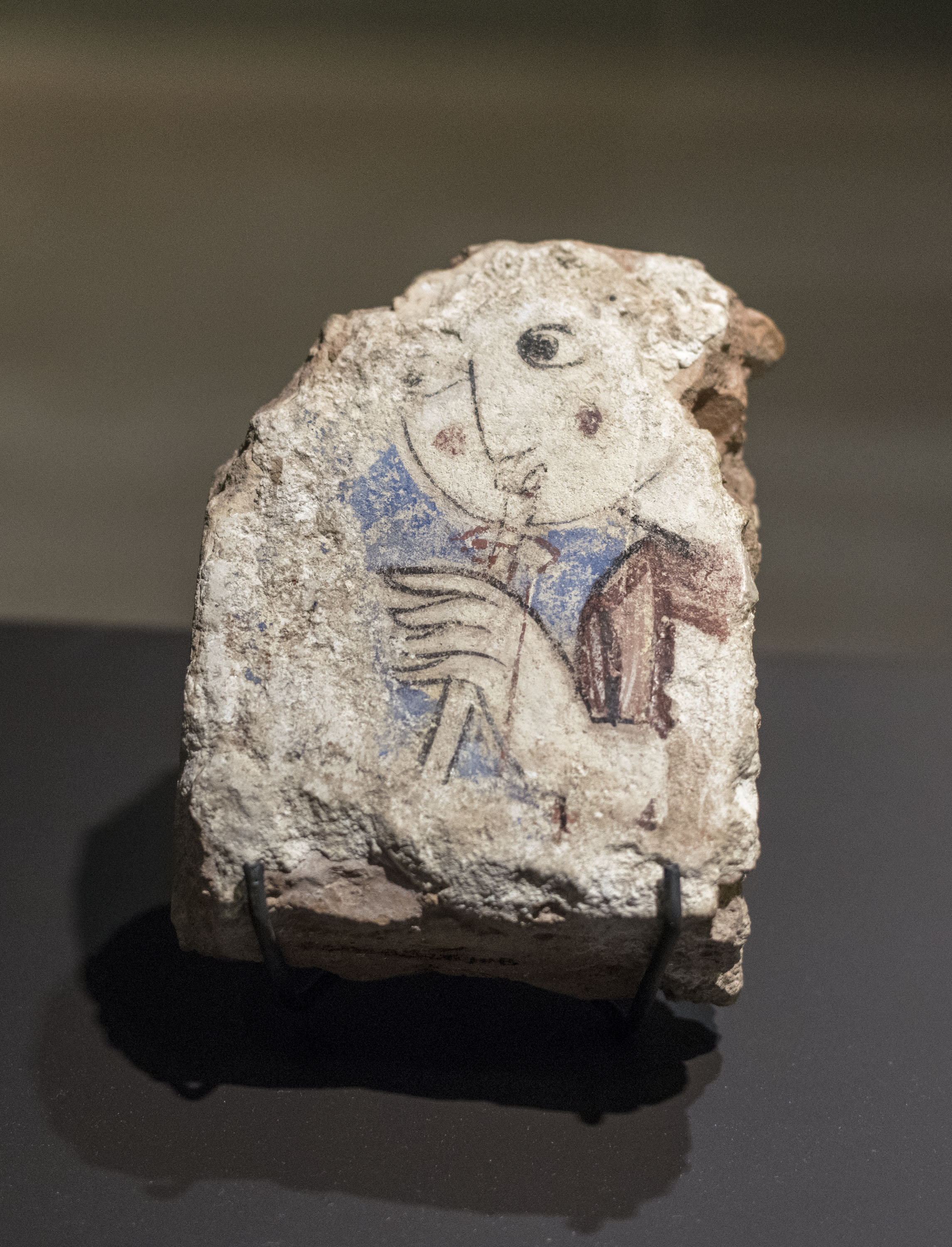
The Flautist, an ancient muqarnas fragment from the Dar As-Sugra palace, depicting a woman playing the mizmar.

The earliest known use of the site dates back to a palace built before 1145, first referenced in historical records as Dar As-Sugra. It was a recreational palace located outside the walls of the Arab medina of Murcia. This residential area had access to water from the Acequia Mayor Aljufía irrigation canal, which runs along the southern side of the monastery.

This late Almoravid structure was later renovated or rebuilt by Ibn Mardanis (the Wolf King) during his reign (1147-1172), enhancing its dimensions and luxurious features. After the Almohad conquest of Murcia in 1172, the building fell into disuse. Archaeological evidence of its muqarnas dome suggests that its paintings were concealed due to Almohad religious orthodoxy.

== Al-Qasr Al-Sagir (1228–1266) ==
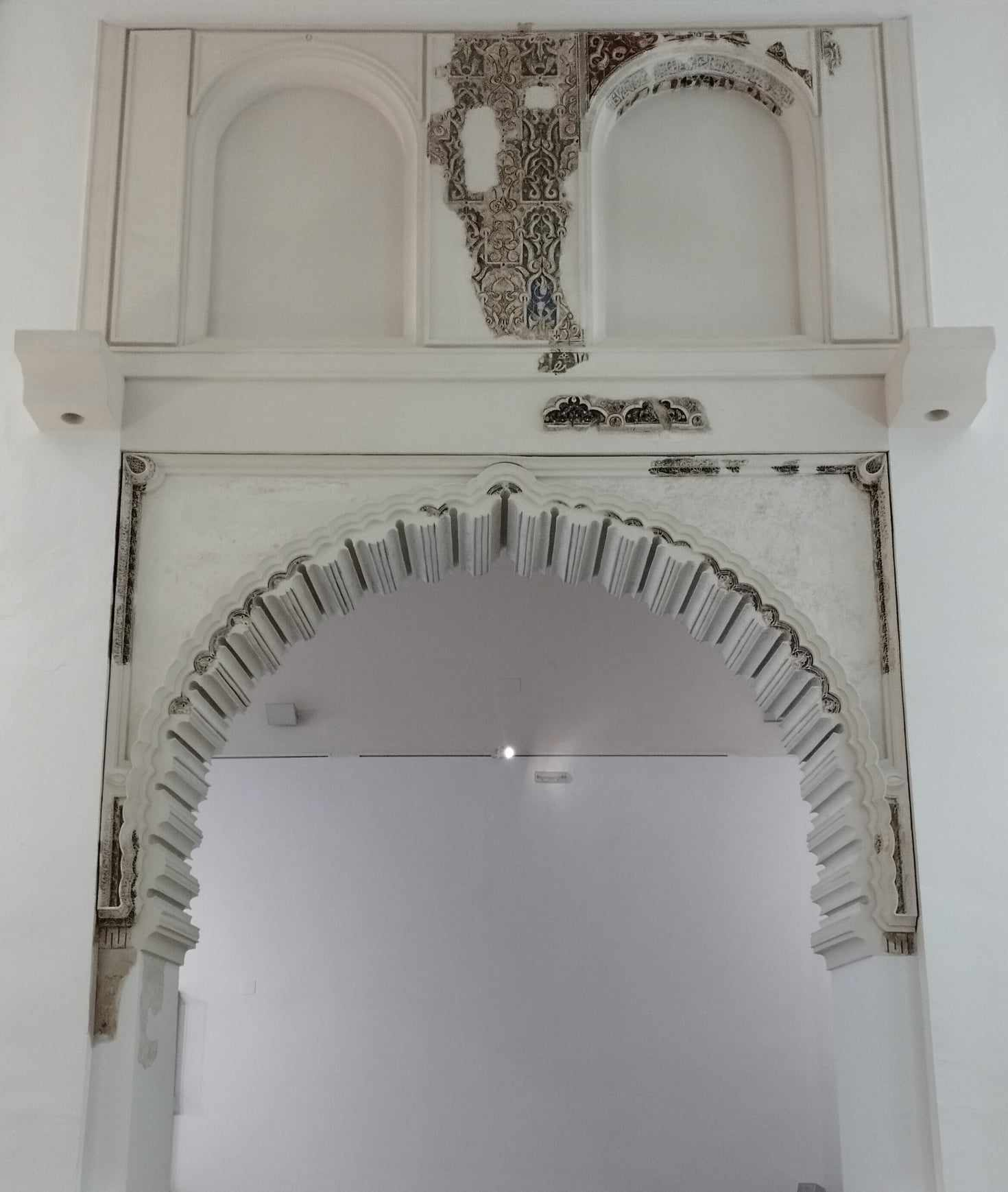
Detail of the stuccoed arch of the northern hall (13th century)

During the rule of Ibn Hud, between 1228 and 1238, the previous palace was transformed into Al-Qasr al-Sagir (Alcázar Menor), a new recreational palace in the Arrixaca area. It was smaller than its predecessor but still maintained significant grandeur.

The monastery largely preserves the structure of Al-Qasr al-Sagir, making its remains among the most valuable archaeological elements of the complex. The ruling family also possessed the Alcázar Mayor, the primary royal residence located in the southern part of the city, near the Segura River.

Following Ibn Hud's assassination in 1238 and the signing of the Treaty of Alcaraz (1243), Murcia became a protectorate of the Crown of Castile, retaining autonomy for its Muslim population. Under the treaty, the Alcázar Mayor was occupied by a Christian garrison, making the Alcázar Menor the primary residence of the Murcian royal family led by Ibn Hud al-Dawla.

== Residence of Christian monarchs (1266–1365) ==
After the Mudéjar revolt of 1264-1266 was suppressed by James I of Aragon, and Murcia was permanently incorporated into Castilian control on February 2, 1266, the Alcázar Menor became a royal residence. It hosted notable figures such as Alfonso X of Castile, Violant of Aragon, and James I of Aragon during their visits to the Kingdom of Murcia.

During this period, the palace estate, which included other structures, baths, gardens, and orchards, was subdivided among various royal beneficiaries. This resulted in separate properties like the Real de la Reina and the estate of Infante Don Fernando. King James I stayed in Murcia again in 1274 at these estates.

== Convent (1365–1367) ==
Previously, sections of the palace had already been granted to the Franciscans. However, in 1365, Peter I of Castile donated his royal chambers to Abbess Berenguela de Espín and the Poor Clares, which have owned it ever since.

In 1367, the nuns obtained permission from Bishop Nicolás de Aguilar to repurpose the semi-ruined palace into a convent. The old Muslim courtyard became the center of monastic life, with arcades and additional buildings gradually added.
