= San Juan de Dios museum =

Coordinates: 37°59′00″N 1°07′41″W

Church of San Juan de Dios
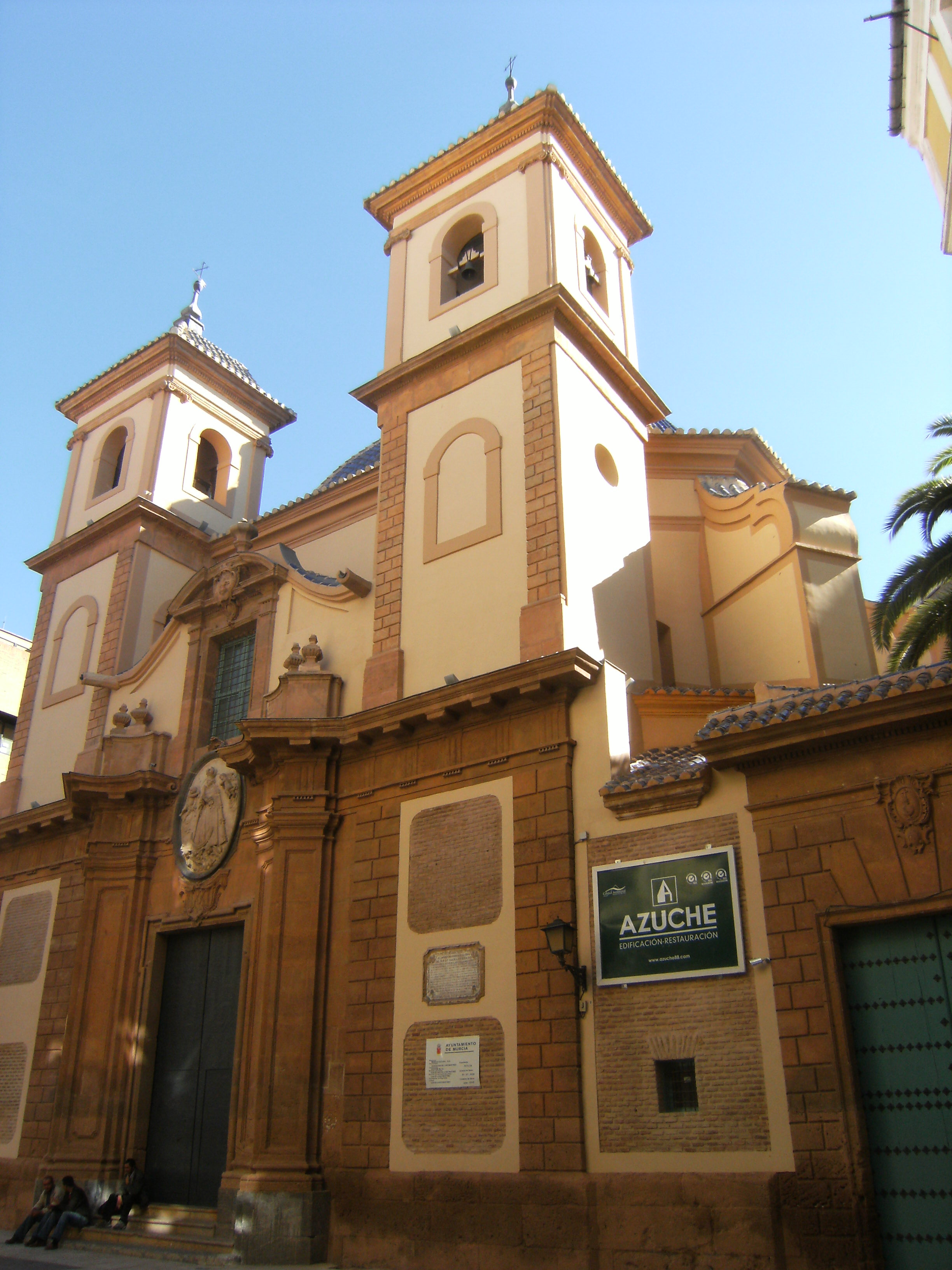
- Facade of the Church of San Juan de Dios

Religion
- Affiliation: Semi-desacralized
- District: Diocese of Cartagena
- Ecclesiastical or organizational status: Museum and church
- Year consecrated: 1764–1781
- Status: Museum

Location
- Location: Murcia, Spain
- Interactive map of Church of San Juan de Dios

Architecture
- Style: Islamic art, Baroque, and Rococo
- Designated as NHL: 26 September 1980

The Museum of the Church of San Juan de Dios in Murcia, Region of Murcia, Spain, is one of the locations of the Museum of Fine Arts of Murcia (MUBAM). It houses an important collection of religious imagery from the 15th to the 20th century. The 18th century former church is in a traditional square near the Cathedral in the historic center of Murcia. The church was part of the former Templar San Juan de Dios Hospital, which had previously been the fortress and palace of the Muslim ruler.

== History of the Building ==
=== The Qasaba of Murcia ===
Archaeological excavations have uncovered a vast palatial-military complex or citadel (qasaba). Within its walls stood the palace for governor (qasr) and other buildings linked to the court. The valuable remains of some of the complex are exhibited in the underground area of the museum.

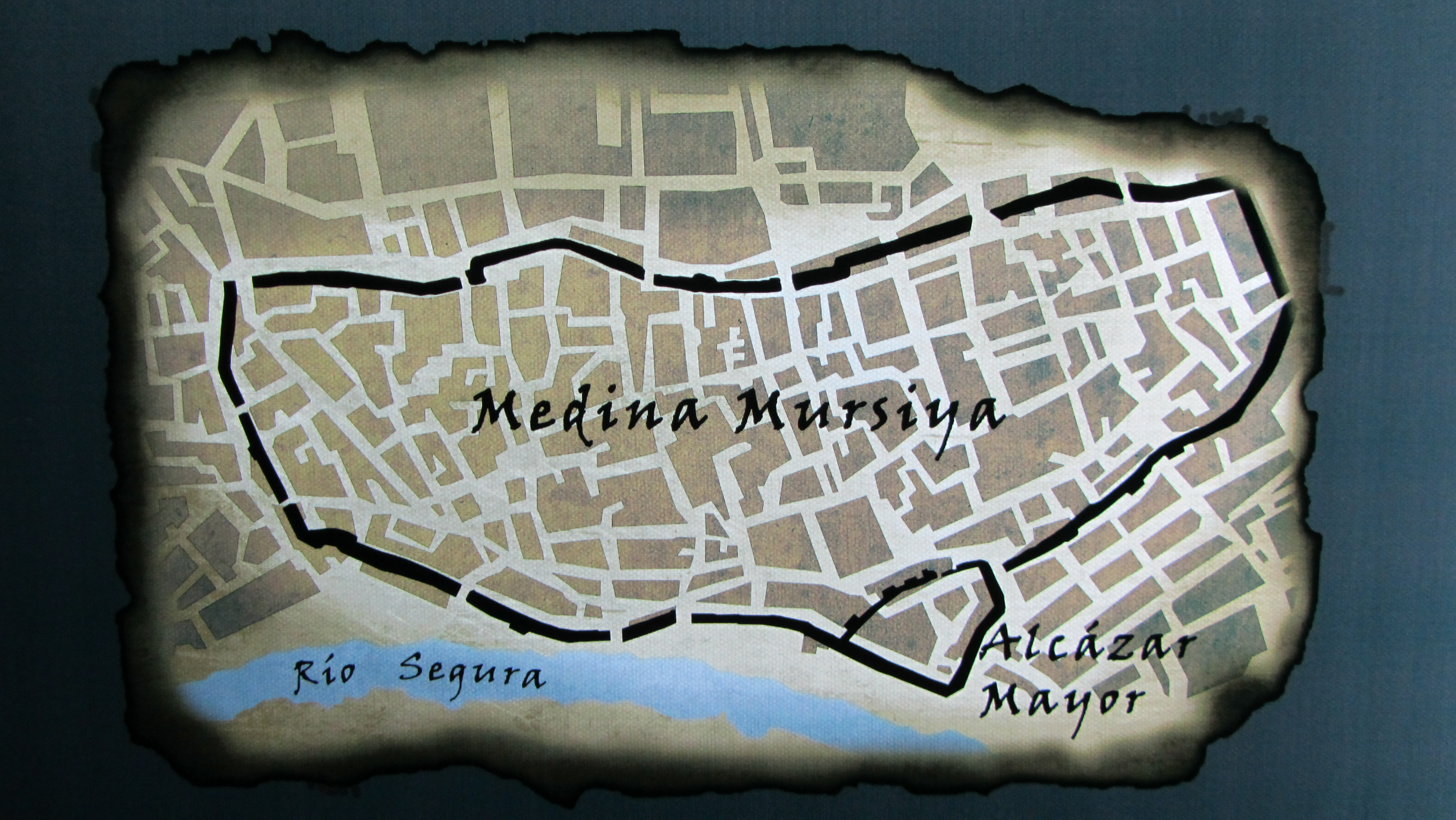
Depiction of the Alcázar Mayor in relation to medieval Murcia and its arrabales

When the Emirate of Murcia became a protectorate of Castile under the Treaty of Alcaraz in 1243, the future Alfonso X entered the city and took possession of the complex. The Muslim former royal family, who still had official status relocated to the suburb of Arrixaca.

=== First Church in Murcia ===
It's not clear when the first church was built. There is a tradition that the first Christian church in Murcia was built over the palace's mosque, the remains of which are found underground. This complex was later granted by James I of Aragon to the primary adelantado responsible for Murcia, Alfonso García de Villamayor, after the Aragonese king suppressed the Mudejar revolt of 1264-1266. This marked the end of the protectorate and the application of the right of conquest over the city.

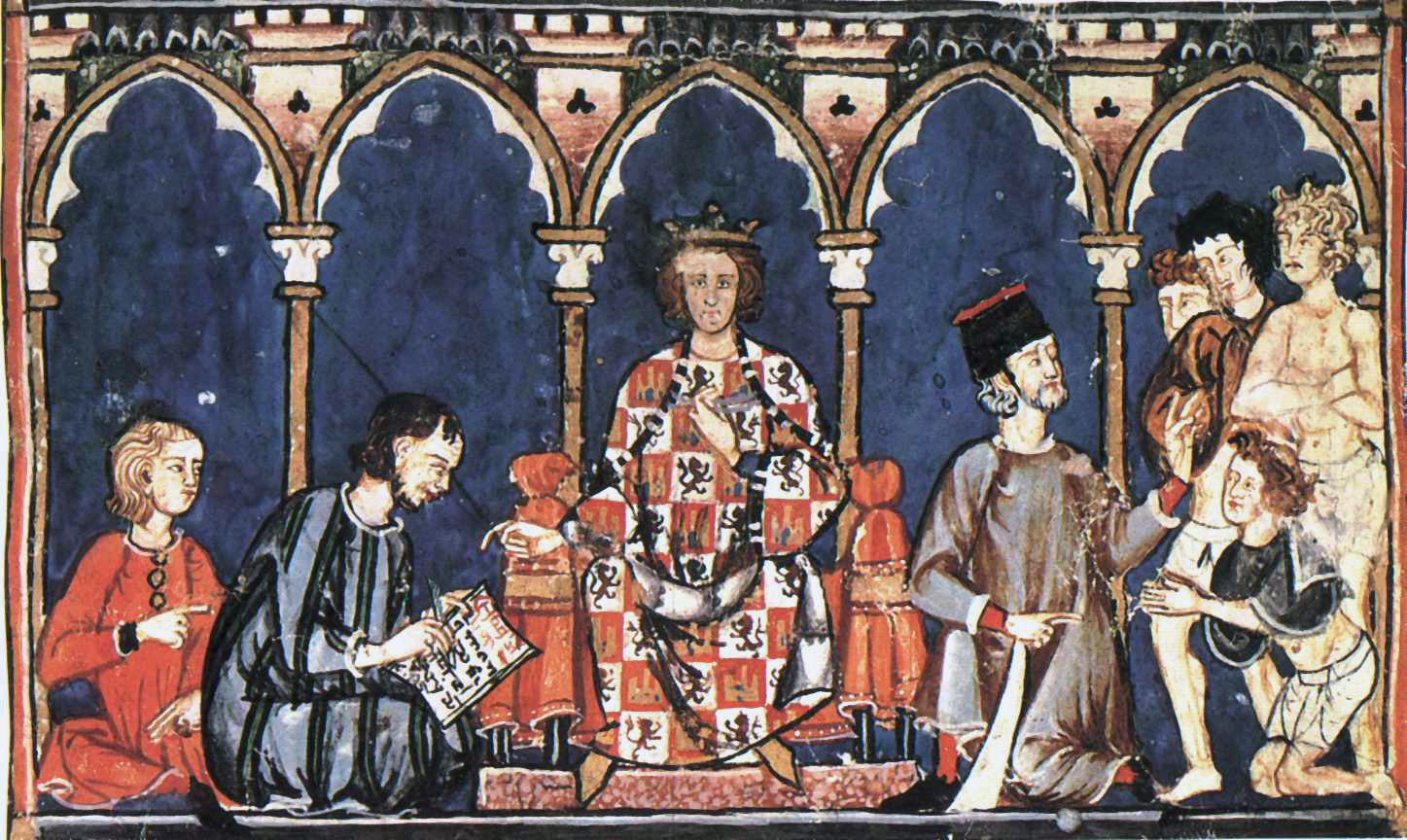
Alfonso X "the Wise," who wished to be buried in the church

Another potential date of the church's origin is from a royal charter in 1277 states that Alfonso X had already ordered the construction of a church in the "alcaçar", possibly where a priest from different Murcia parishes celebrated mass every Saturday as early as 1272.

In his will, Alfonso X explicitly stated his wish to be buried in this monastery, though he also mentioned that if this were not possible, his entrails should be removed and sent there. Ultimately, both his entrails and heart were interred in the church.

The Templars later took over the church and installed a hospital on part of the site. After the dissolution of the Templar Order in 1314, the Order of Calatrava assumed control of the Alcázar, the church, and the hospital. It remained Murcia's most important hospital until the middle of the Twentieth century.

Over time, the fortress lost its strategic function, leading Henry III of Castile to order the construction of a new fortification further west at the beginning of the 15th century.

== The Church and Museum ==
The current church was built between 1764 and 1781, replacing the earlier structure. It is a masterpiece of Rococo architecture designed by Martín Solera. The church was later desacralized and transformed into a museum displaying religious sculptures from the 15th to 19th centuries, as well as works by Juan González Moreno. It also preserves archaeological remains of the Muslim Alcázar in its underground section.

== Architecture ==
The church features an unusual elliptical plan, designed to function as a grand shrine for the Eucharist. The interior decoration is characterized by rich Rococo ornamentation, with eight pillars supporting the roof and six chapels arranged radially. The facade includes two square-based towers with Baroque and Rococo elements, showing influences from Bernini's San Andrea al Quirinale in Rome.

== Museum Sections ==
The Church: Houses religious sculptures from the 15th to 18th centuries, including works by Francisco Salzillo.

The Juan González Moreno Collection: Showcased in the choir and ambulatory, this collection was donated by the artist in 1996.

The Muslim Alcázar: Features a preserved section of the original Alcázar, including the mihrab and tombs from the 12th century.
