= Conquest of Murcia =

Conquest of Murcia may refer to:

- Conquest of Murcia (1265–66) by James I of Aragon
- Conquest of Murcia in 1243 by Ferdinand III of Castile
