= Timeline of Murcia =

The following is a timeline of the history of the city of Murcia, Spain.

== Prior to 20th century ==
- 8th C. – Moors took possession of Medinat Mursiya.
- 1172 – Almohades in power.
- 1243 – Forces of Ferdinand III of Castile take Murcia.
- 1265 – Conquest of Murcia (1265–66).
- 1269 – Rising against King Alfonso the wise led to Murcia joining the Kingdom of Castile.
- 1272 – University of Murcia first established by King Alfonso the wise
- 1291 – Made an episcopal see.
- 1467 – Murcia Cathedral built.
- 1487 – Printing press in use.
- 1651 – Flood.
- 1736 – Paseo del Malecón rebuilt.
- 1786 – Jardín de Floridablanca (garden) established.
- 1810 – City besieged by French forces.
- 1812 – City besieged by French forces again.
- 1829 – March: 1829 Torrevieja earthquake.
- 1842 – Population: 82,517.
- 1862 – Teatro Romea (Murcia) (theatre) opens.
- 1863 – Murcia del Carmen railway station opened.
- 1864 – Archaeological Museum of Murcia founded.
- 1879
  - October: 1879 Segura flood.
  - El Diario de Murcia newspaper begins publication.^{(es)}
- 1887 – Population: 98,538.
- 1892 – Teatro Circo Murcia (theatre) opens.
- 1900 – Population: 111,539.

== 20th century ==
- 1903 – La Verdad newspaper begins publication.
- 1907 – Flood.
- 1910
  - Museo de Bellas Artes de Murcia (museum) built.
  - Archaeological Museum of Murcia relocated.
  - Population: 125,057.
- 1915 – University of Murcia established.
- 1917 – Murcia Conservatory of Music founded.
- 1919 – Real Murcia founded.
- 1930 – Population: 158,724.
- 1931 – Archivo Histórico Provincial de Murcia (provincial archives) established.
- 1940 – Population: 193,731.
- 1960 – Population: 249,738.
- 1988 – La Opinión de Murcia newspaper begins publication.
- 1991 – Population: 338,250.
- 1995 – Auditorio y Centro de Congresos Víctor Villegas (convention centre) opens.
- 1996
  - Biblioteca Regional de Murcia (library) established.
  - Universidad Católica San Antonio de Murcia founded.

== 21st century ==
- 2011
  - Murcia tram starts operation.
  - Population: 437,667.
- 2015 – José Ballesta becomes mayor.
- 2019 – Murcia–San Javier Airport opens.

== See also ==
- Murcia history
- History of Murcia

Other cities in the autonomous community of the Region of Murcia:^{(es)}

- Timeline of Cartagena, Spain
- List of municipalities in Murcia province

== Bibliography ==
in English

- Josiah Conder (1830), "Murcia", The Modern Traveller, London: J.Duncan
- Richard Ford (1890), "Murcia", Handbook for Travellers in Spain (7th ed.), London: J. Murray
- Richard Stephen Charnock (1894), "Murcia", Bradshaw's Illustrated Hand-book to Spain and Portugal, W.J. Adams & Sons, OCLC 36885426
- "Murcia (town)" . Encyclopædia Britannica. Vol. 19 (11th ed.). 1910. p. 33.
- A.F. Calvert (1911). Valencia and Murcia, a Glance at African Spain. The Spanish series. London: John Lane.
- "Murcia", Spain and Portugal (4th ed.), Leipzig: Karl Baedeker, 1913, hdl:2027/uc2.ark:/13960/t5q81nw29 – via HathiTrust

in Spanish

- Rodrigo Amador de los Ríos y Villalta [in Spanish] (1889). Murcia y Albacete. España: sus monumentos y artes, su naturaleza e historia (in Spanish). Barcelona: Daniel Cortezo y ca.
- Francisco Alemán Saínz (1984). Diccionario incompleto de la Región de Murcia (in Spanish). Editora Regional de Murcia. ISBN 978-84-7564-007-5.
- Francisco Javier Díez de Revenga; Mariano de Paco (1989). Historia de la literatura murciana (in Spanish). Editora Regional de Murcia. ISBN 978-84-87408-04-5.
- Carmen María Cremades Griñán (1996). Urbanismo en la edad moderna: la región de Murcia (in Spanish). Universidad de Murcia. ISBN 978-84-7684-704-6.
