= Royal Monastery of Saint Clare =

Cultural property in Murcia, Spain

Coordinates: 37.9881°N 1.1304°W

- Monasterio de Santa Clara la Real
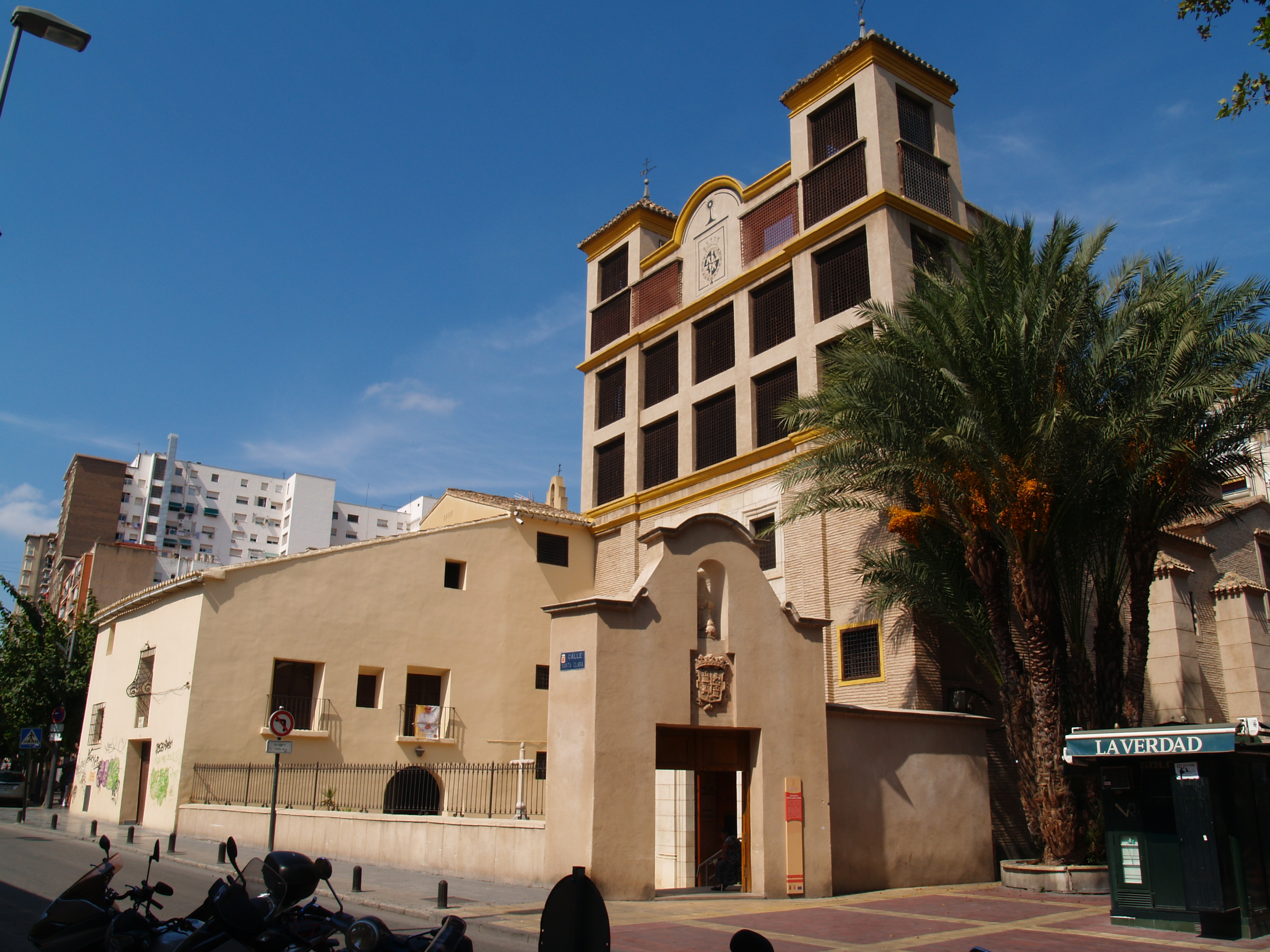
- Facade of the building.

Monastery information
- Order: Poor Clares
- Denomination: Catholic Church
- Established: Originally an Arab palace (12th-13th centuries), monastery (15th century), and church (17th-18th centuries)
- Diocese: Diocese of Cartagena

Architecture
- Heritage designation: Bien de Interés Cultural, monument (RI-51-0004527, 30-10-1981)
- Style: Islamic art, Gothic, and Baroque

Site
- Location: Arrixaca, Murcia
- Country: Spain

The Royal Monastery of Saint Clare (Monasterio de Santa Clara la Real) is a monastery of the Poor Clares located in Murcia, Spain. Originating in the 14th century and occupying the site of a 13th century Muslim palace, it is one of the most historically significant buildings in the city. It contains remains of the Arab palace, which are among the most important examples of Islamic art in Murcia. The monastery also features a Gothic cloister and choir, as well as a Baroque church.

Part of the building currently houses the Museum of Santa Clara, while the western wing hosts the Las Claras Cultural Center of Caja Murcia.

== History ==
=== Dar As-Sugra (12th century) ===
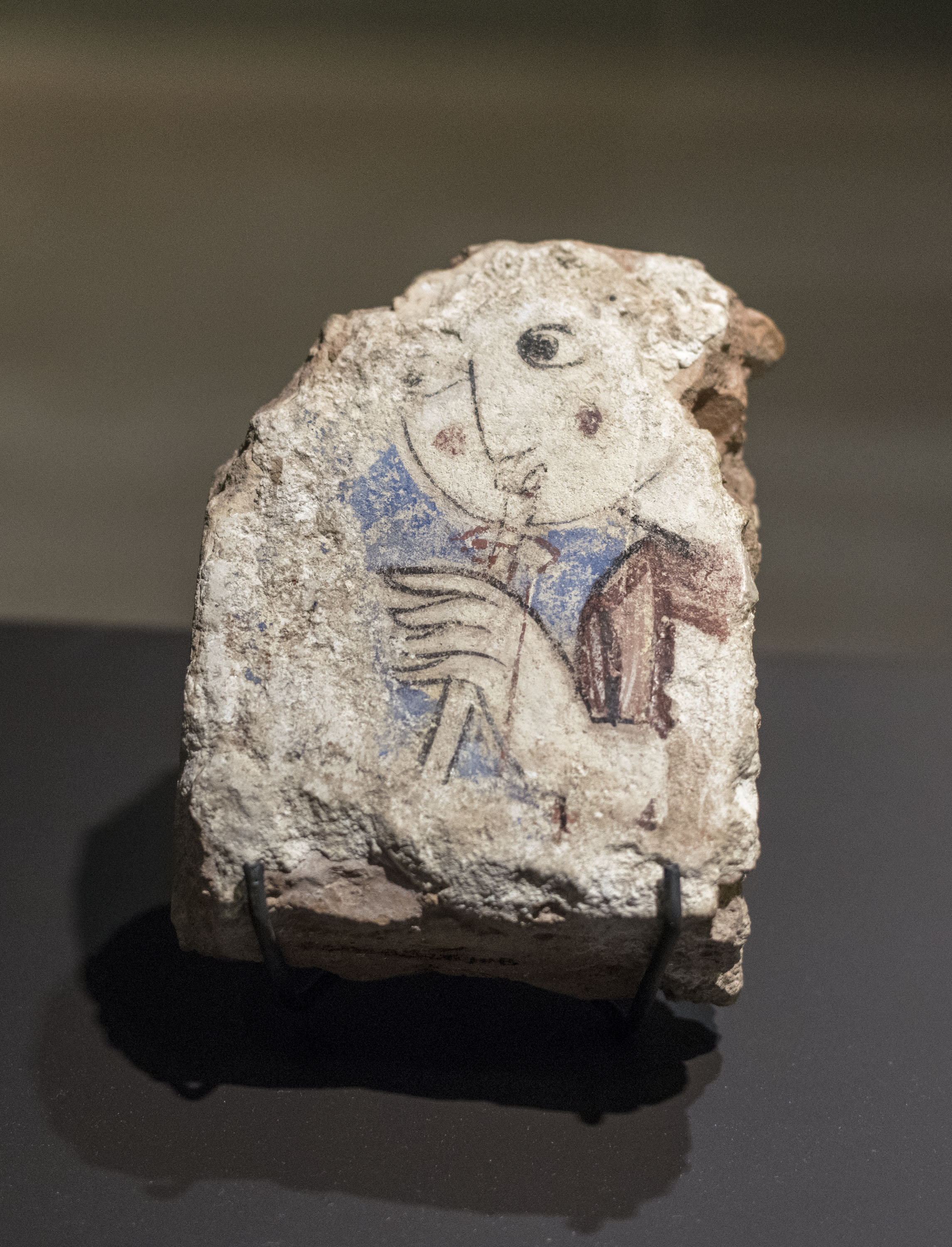
The Flautist, an ancient muqarnas fragment from the Dar As-Sugra palace, depicting a woman playing the mizmar.

The earliest mention of the site was a recreational palace, the Dar As-Sugra located outside Murcia's walls in Arrixaca which had access to water from an irrigation canal running along its southern side. This was expanded by Ibn Mardanis (the Wolf King) during his reign (1147-1172). After the Almohad's conquered Murcia in 1172, the building fell into disuse with its paintings concealed due to Almohad religious orthodoxy.

=== Al-Qasr Al-Sagir (1228—1365) ===
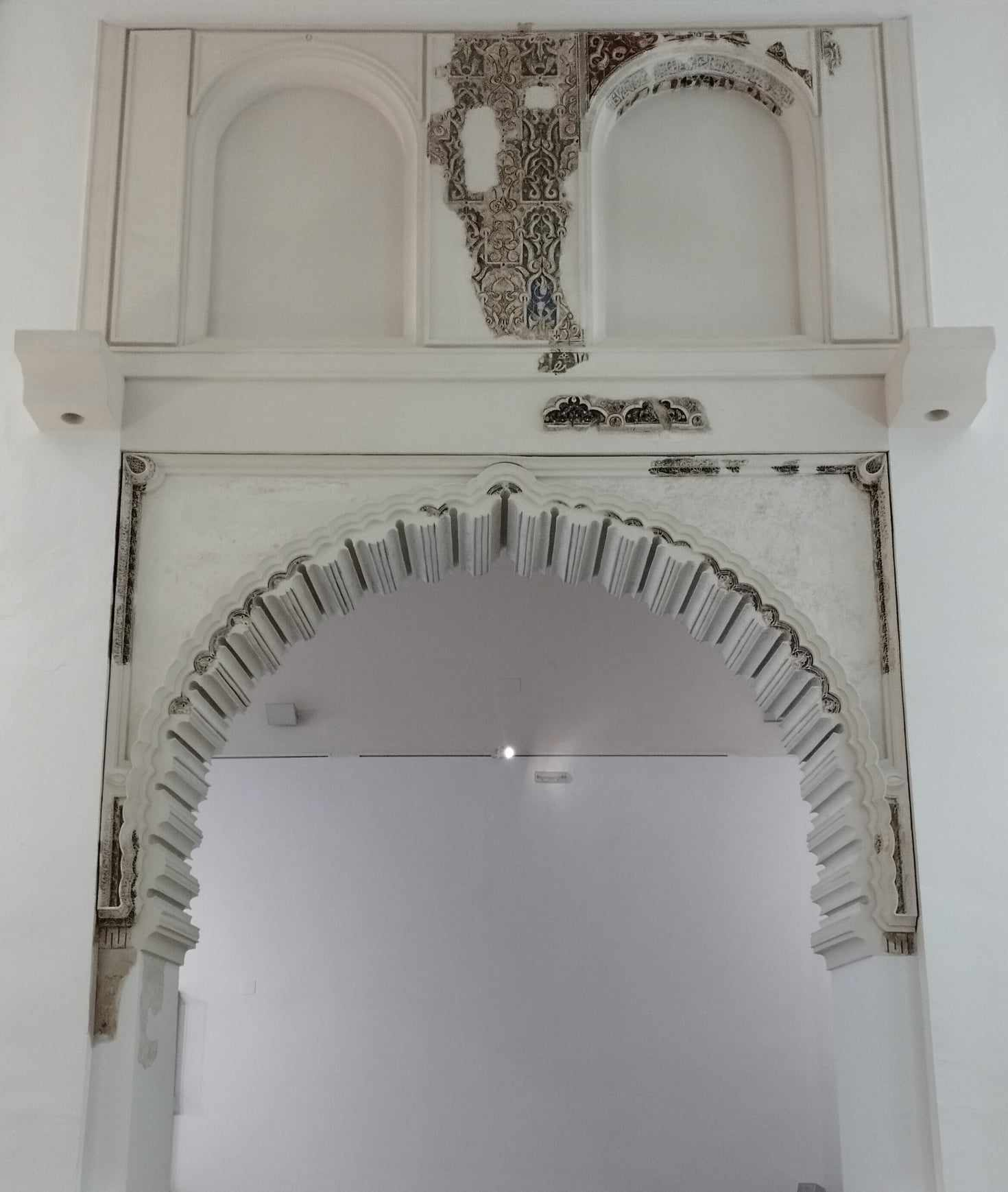
Detail of the stuccoed arch of the northern hall (13th century)

During the rule of Ibn Hud, between 1228 and 1238, the previous palace was transformed into a new smaller recreational palace, the Al-Qasr al-Sagir. The structure of Al-Qasr al-Sagiris largely preserved in the monastery, among its most valuable archaeological elements. The ruling family also possessed the Alcázar Mayor, the primary royal residence located in the southern part of Murcia, near the Segura River.

Under the Treaty of Alcaraz (1243), Murcia became a protectorate of the Crown of Castile, retaining autonomy for its Muslim population and the main palace was occupied by a Christian garrison, making Al-Qasr al-Sagir the primary residence of the Muslim Murcian royal family.

Murcia was permanently incorporated into Castile after a Muslim revolt and the palace became a royal residence hosting royal visitors when they were in the Kingdom of Murcia with the palace estate subdivided among various royal beneficiaries.

=== Monastery of the Poor Clares (1365–present) ===
Previously, sections of the palace had already been granted to the Franciscans. However, in 1365, Peter I of Castile donated his royal chambers to Abbess Berenguela de Espín and the Order of the Poor Clares, which have owned it ever since.

In 1367, the nuns obtained permission from Bishop Nicolás de Aguilar to repurpose the semi-ruined palace into a convent. The old Muslim courtyard became the center of monastic life, with arcades and additional buildings gradually added.

The monastery flourished at the end of the 15th century, receiving the patronage of the Catholic Monarchs, which enabled the construction of the cloister and a new Gothic church.

During the 17th century, significant renovations took place, including the construction of a new Baroque church by Melchor de Luzón. Only the upper choir from the original Gothic church was preserved. The church was later redecorated in Rococo style in the 18th century.

== Museum of Santa Clara ==
The monastery houses the Museum of Santa Clara, which has two main sections:

- Islamic Art and Archaeology Section - Displays architectural remains from the palace, including stucco, muqarnas, and calligraphic epigraphy, along with artifacts from the Archaeological Museum of Murcia.
- Times of Silence - Showcases religious art from the monastery, including sculptures by Francisco Salzillo and paintings by Senén Vila.

== Bibliography ==
- Rodríguez Llopis, Miguel. Historia de la Región de Murcia. Tres Fronteras, Murcia, 2004. ISBN 84-7564-200-4.
- Estrella Sevilla, Emilio. Dos siglos a la sombra de una torre. Contraste Producciones, S.L., Murcia, 2007. ISBN 978-84-612-0451-9.
