= Acequia Mayor Aljufía =

Irrigation canal in Region of Murcia, Spain

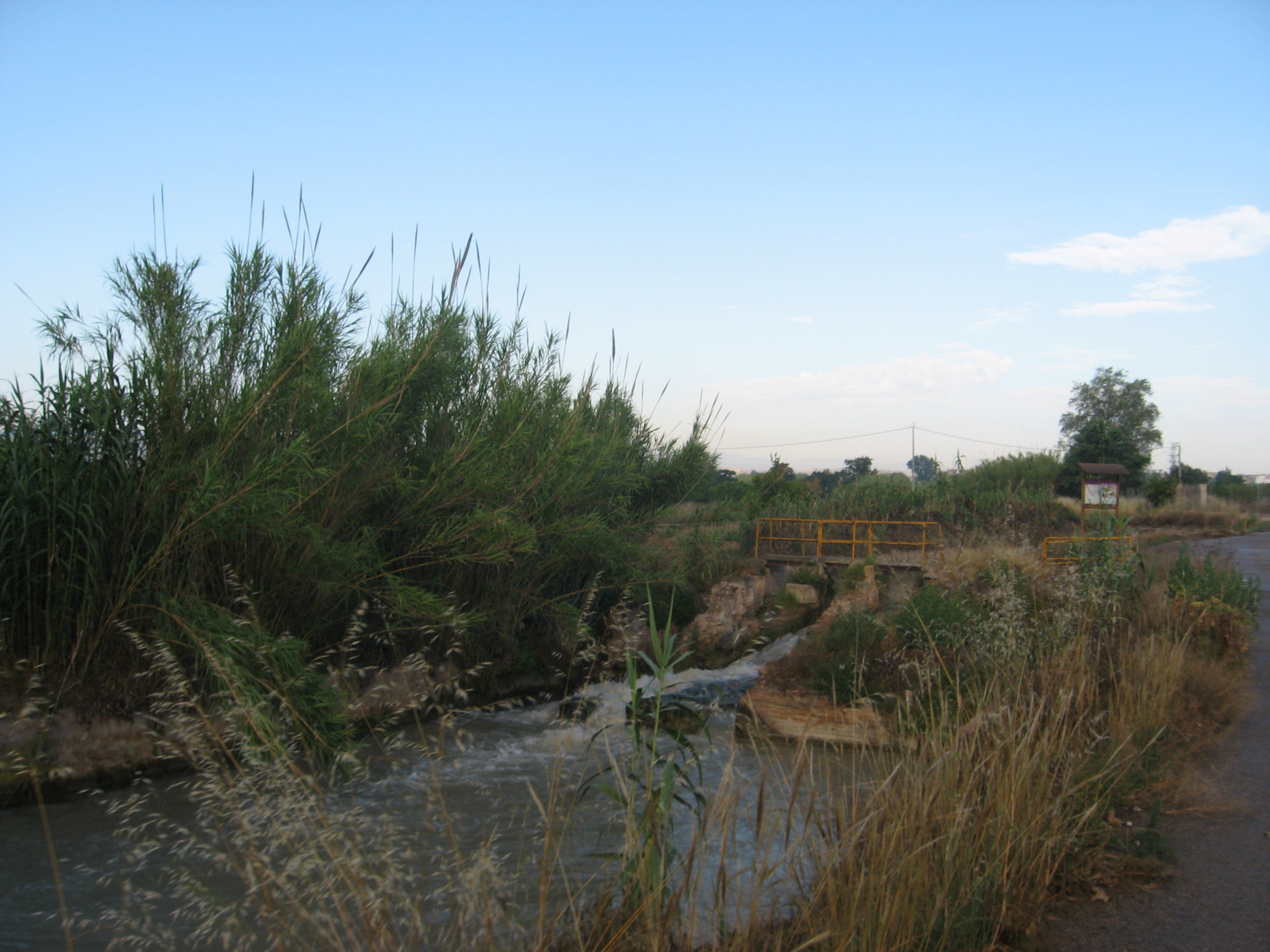
- Remains of the Molino Bajo de la Pólvora or Canalaos on the Acequia Mayor Aljufía, between Guadalupe and Rincón de Beniscornia.
- Location: Region of Murcia, Spain

Specifications
- Length: 27 km (17 miles)
- Status: Active

Geography
- Start point: Contraparada
- End point: Huerta de Orihuela

The Acequia Mayor Aljufía is one of the two major Acequia (irrigation canals) that structure the traditional irrigation network of the Huerta de Murcia (Region of Murcia, Spain), drawing its water from the Segura River. It is one of the most representative irrigation systems in the country.

While the Aljufía supplies the orchards on the northern side of the Segura—running parallel to it—the Acequia Mayor Alquibla serves those on the south. The name "Aljufía" comes from the Arabic al-Yawfiyya, meaning "the northern one."

== Characteristics ==
The canal takes its water—like the Alquibla—from the so-called Azud Mayor or Contraparada, located between the villages of Javalí Nuevo and Javalí Viejo, at the point where the Segura enters the Guadalentín Valley.

It supplies water to the entire Northern Major Irrigation Area, just as the Alquibla provides for the Southern Major Irrigation Area.

The canal extends for 27 kilometers—compared to the 22 kilometers of the Alquibla—passing through the villages of Javalí Viejo, La Ñora (where the famous noria is located), Rincón de Beniscornia, Guadalupe, La Albatalía, and La Arboleja. It also crosses the urban area of Murcia, although today it does so through underground pipes; in the past, sections of the canal could be seen in the open within the city.

After crossing Murcia (from the Santa Ana water distributor), it takes on different names, including Benetúcer, Benefiar, and Benizar. In its final stretch, it merges with the Raal Viejo or Beneluz canal, extending to the orchards of Orihuela.

Many secondary canals branch off from the Acequia Mayor Aljufía, such as Regaliciar, Beniscornia, Churra La Vieja, Alfatego, Belchí, Benipotrox, Béndame Mayor and Menor, Arboleja, Caravija, Zaraiche, Nelva, and Casteliche. These form part of the complex network of distribution channels for "live water" and drainage channels (azarbes) that return water to the main flow as "dead water."

== History ==
The origins of the canal date back at least to the 10th century, although Muslim authors such as Al-Himyari described them as: "Water conduits built by the ancients that irrigate the north and south of Mursiya."

This suggests that its origins may be even older, possibly linked to water management systems from the Roman period, as evidenced by discoveries at the Senda de Granada archaeological site.

In medieval times, the canal ran along the northern side of the walled city of Murcia, outside the Arab Walls of Murcia. This facilitated the development of the Arrixaca suburb, where the wealthy Andalusian families established their almunias thanks to the availability of water. It is no coincidence that rulers like Ibn Mardanis (12th century) and Ibn Hud (13th century) built their recreational palaces in this area, drawing water directly from the Aljufía.

After the Conquest of Murcia, the canal continued to be crucial for supplying numerous convents and palaces nearby, as well as for industrial purposes. Several mills were built along its course, including gunpowder mills established from the 17th century, leading to the creation of the Royal Gunpowder Factory in the 18th century. Additionally, the Royal Silk Factory was constructed in the same period.

== Controversy ==
With the decline of traditional agriculture in the Huerta de Murcia, lack of active policies for its maintenance, landscape conservation, and the rise of residential (both legal and illegal) and industrial construction, several sections of the Acequia Mayor Aljufía have been enclosed in underground pipes, causing controversy. This has been particularly contentious near the Noria de La Ñora.

Various citizen organizations are working to combat this situation, opposing the enclosure of these canals due to the irreversible damage to the Segura Valley's ecosystem. The canal supports a rich riparian ecosystem, including species such as poplar (Populus), willow (Salix), common carp (Cyprinidae), barbel (Barbus Barbus), and European eel (Anguilla anguilla). The enclosures also lead to the loss of historical, cultural, and landscape heritage.
