= Church of San Andrés (Murcia) =

Church in Murcia, Spain

Coordinates: 37.9864°N 1.1384°W

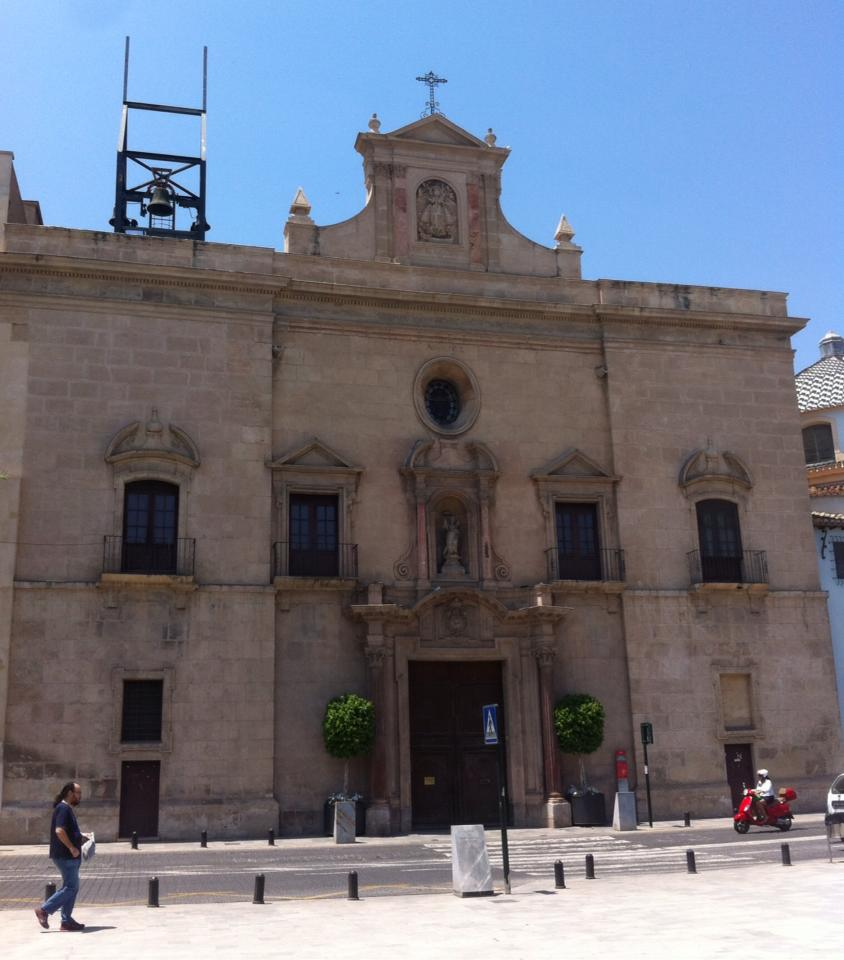
- Façade of the Church of San Andrés in the Plaza de San Agustín

Location
- Country: Spain
- Interactive map of Church of San Andrés

The Church of San Andrés is one of the traditional parish churches in the historic center of Murcia, Spain, located in the San Andrés neighborhood, in the Plaza de San Agustín.

The parish dates back to shortly after the Conquest of Murcia, originally located outside the city's walls in the suburb of Arrixaca. However, the current church was originally the conventual church of the Augustinians, which, after the Ecclesiastical confiscations of Mendizábal, was repurposed several times until, in 1886, it became the parish church of San Andrés due to the poor condition of the previous parish church, located on Calle San Andrés, which no longer exists today.

== History ==
The parish of San Andrés emerged in the northwestern sector of the arrabal of the Arrixaca. Following James I of Aragon's Conquest of Murcia in February 1266, Alfonso X of Castile assigned this district to the Mudéjars. However, many of its inhabitants emigrated to the Nasrid Kingdom of Granada, and by 1272, two Catholic parishes, San Miguel and Santiago, were established in the northern part of the arrabal, later called Arrixaca Vieja. The continued depopulation of the Morería of Murcia led to the foundation of the parish of San Andrés in 1293, in what became known as Arrixaca Nueva.

The presence of Augustinians in Murcia dates back to 1397. They initially settled outside the city near the San Antón monastery, close to the former gate of Castile in the suburb wall. In 1514, they were granted the care of the old hermitage of San Sebastián, near the current Plaza de San Agustín. However, the monks maintained their monastery outside the city walls, frequently affected by flooding by the Segura River. In 1579, they moved permanently inside the walls near the hermitage, and in 1580, they were given the adjacent chapel of Murcia's patron saint, the Virgin of the Arrixaca, leading to the construction of the original convent in that location.

On August 2, 1600, the Royal and Illustrious Brotherhood of Our Father Jesus Nazareno (Murcia) was officially established in this church.

In 1630, Pedro Molina, Marquis of Corvera, rebuilt the Chapel of the Virgin of the Arrixaca, the oldest surviving part of the church. The 1651 San Calixto flood caused severe damage, but the complex was later restored. By the mid-18th century, during Murcia's Golden Age, construction of a new convent, including the present church, began in 1748 and was completed in 1762 with support from Bishop Diego de Rojas y Contreras. In 1765, a dispute between the Augustinians and the Brotherhood of Our Father Jesus Nazareno resulted in the latter's chapel (the Church of Jesus) becoming independent, sealing off the arch connecting the two.

During the Spanish confiscation of the 1830s, after an attempted arson and desecration in 1835, the convent and church were used as a gunpowder magazine and coal storage. The convent was demolished in 1846 to build a new bullring. In 1853, Bishop Mariano Barrio Fernández managed to acquire the church and fund restoration work. The official transfer of the parish from the deteriorated building on Calle San Andrés to the restored San Agustín church took place in November 1886.

During the Spanish Civil War (1936–1939), the church was once again repurposed as a warehouse and garage. It was reopened for worship at the end of the war after undergoing repairs.

== Architecture ==
The Church of San Andrés has a Latin cross layout with side chapels between buttresses and a high choir at the entrance. The central nave is one of the largest in the city, featuring a barrel vault with lunettes divided into seven sections by transverse arches. The lateral chapels are interconnected through openings in the buttresses and are covered with groin vaults.

The church also features a dome on pendentives over the transept and semicircular apses in the transept arms. The façade, completed in 1762, follows a palace-style design and includes two repurposed Roman marble columns believed to originate from ruins in Monteagudo.

== Bibliography ==
- Estrella Sevilla, Emilio (2007). Dos siglos a la sombra de una torre. Murcia: Contraste Producciones, S.L. ISBN 978-84-612-0451-9.
- Consejería de Cultura, Educación y Turismo (1988). Murcia. Guía Artística. Murcia: I. G. Jiménez Godoy. ISBN 84-7564-068-0.
