= Our Lady of Arrixaca =

Marian devotion originating in Murcia, Spain

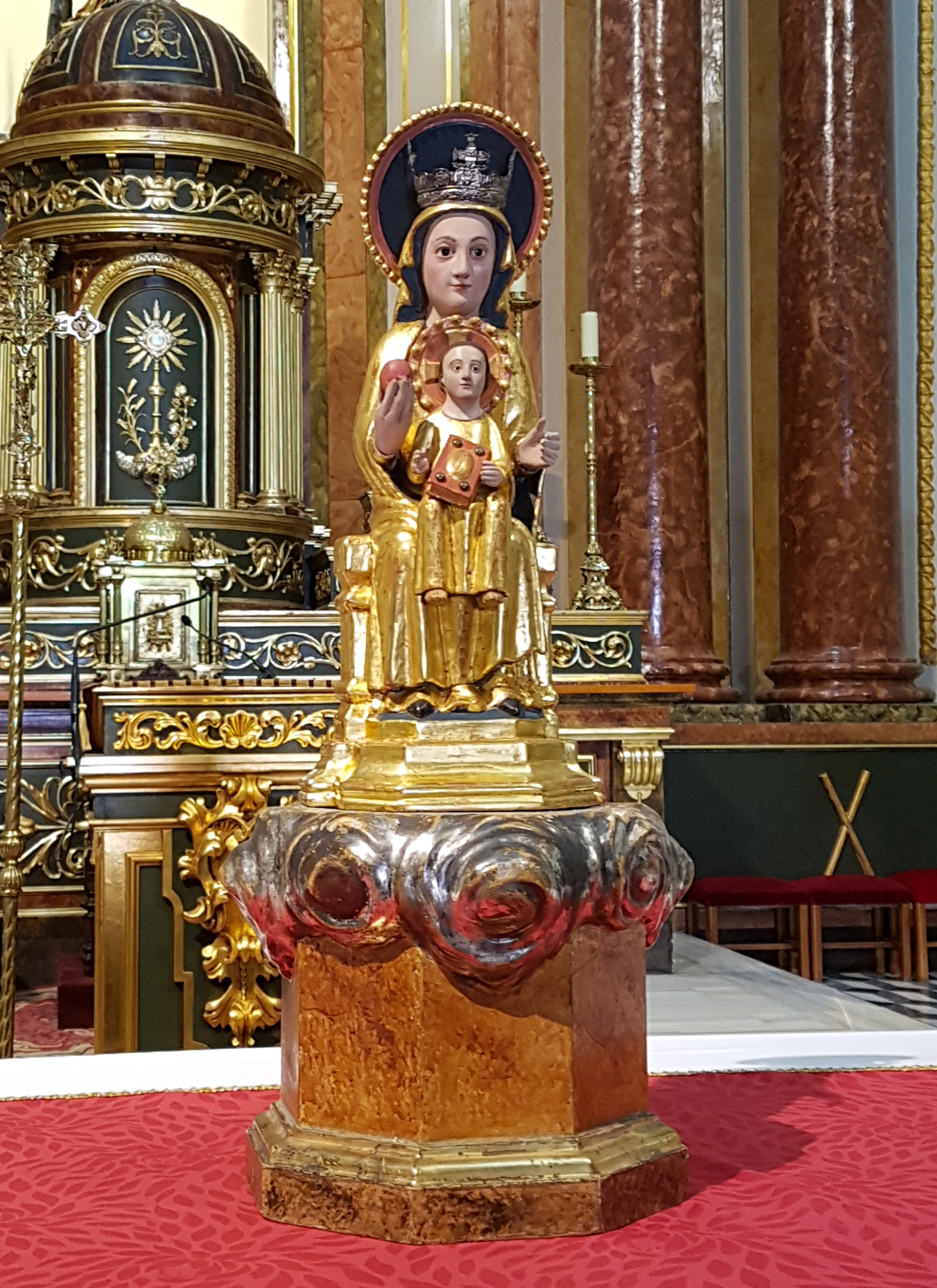
- Our Lady of Arrixaca in the Church of San Andrés
- Born: 12th century (sculpture)
- Venerated in: Roman Catholic Church
- Major shrine: Church of San Andrés (Murcia)
- Feast: Last Sunday of May
- Attributes: Seated Virgin and Child, Romanesque style
- Patronage: City of Murcia (historical), proposed patroness of the Region of Murcia
- Catholic cult suppressed: 1746 (official patronage transferred to Our Lady of Fuensanta)

Our Lady of Arrixaca (Spanish: Virgen de la Arrixaca) is a Marian devotion originating in Murcia, Spain, venerated in the capital since the 13th century.

The image of this Virgin is a polychrome wooden carving from the late Romanesque period, dating back to the 12th century. However, almost nothing remains of the original sculpture due to multiple restorations over time. Her feast day is celebrated on the last Sunday of May, commemorating the entry of Infante Alfonso (later Alfonso X of Castile), son of Ferdinand III of Castile, into the city of Murcia on May 1, 1243. This peaceful entry followed the Treaty of Alcaraz, an agreement made with the successors of Ibn Hud, the last true Arab emir of Murcia.

== Legendary origin ==
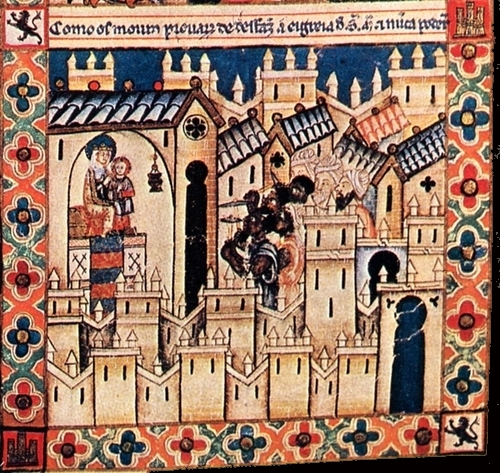
The final miniature of the Cantiga #169, set in the Murcian neighborhood of La Arreixaca, depicts a scene featuring a statue of the Virgin, three contemplative Moors with turbans and neatly trimmed beards and three powerless darker-faced moors wielding weapons.

The name Santa María de la Arrixaca comes from the Arrixaca suburb outside the city walls, where she was originally worshiped.

There is historical debate regarding whether the image was already in Murcia when Alfonso X arrived or if he personally brought it. One theory suggests that the image was located in a chapel in Arrixaca, where Italian Christian silk traders from Pisa and Genoa were allowed to worship during Muslim rule. At the time, Murcia was one of the Mediterranean's main silk producers. An alternative theory suggests that Alfonso brought the image with him and placed it in a Mozarabic hermitage in Arrixaca after taking possession of Murcia in 1243.

Regardless of its origin, Alfonso X dedicated a Cantiga 169 to Our Lady of Arrixaca.

== Unofficial patroness of the city of Murcia ==
The Arrixaca Virgin is venerated in the Royal Chapel of the Church of San Andrés in Murcia. Although she lost her title as patroness in 1746 in favor of Our Lady of Fuensanta, she remains one of the most important Marian devotions in the region. She has recently been proposed as the patroness of the Region of Murcia.
