= San Juan de Dios Hospital (Murcia) =

The San Juan de Dios Hospital in Murcia was a Templar hospital that after the Templars lost it remained as the most important hospital in the city into the until the mid-20th century. Part of it is now the San Juan de Dios museum.

It had earlier been the main fortress and palace of the Emirate of Murcia and it later became a church. The Templars later took over the church and installed a hospital on part of the site, initiating continuous healthcare activity on this land from the 14th century onwards.

After the dissolution of the Templar Order in 1314, the Order of Calatrava assumed control of the fortress, church and hospital. Over time, the fortress lost its strategic function, leading Henry III of Castile to order the construction of a new fortification further west at the beginning of the 15th century.
