= Shrine of Our Lady of Cortes =

Coordinates: 38.6945°N 2.4711°W

Royal Monastery and Shrine of Our Lady of Cortes
- Santuario de Cortes
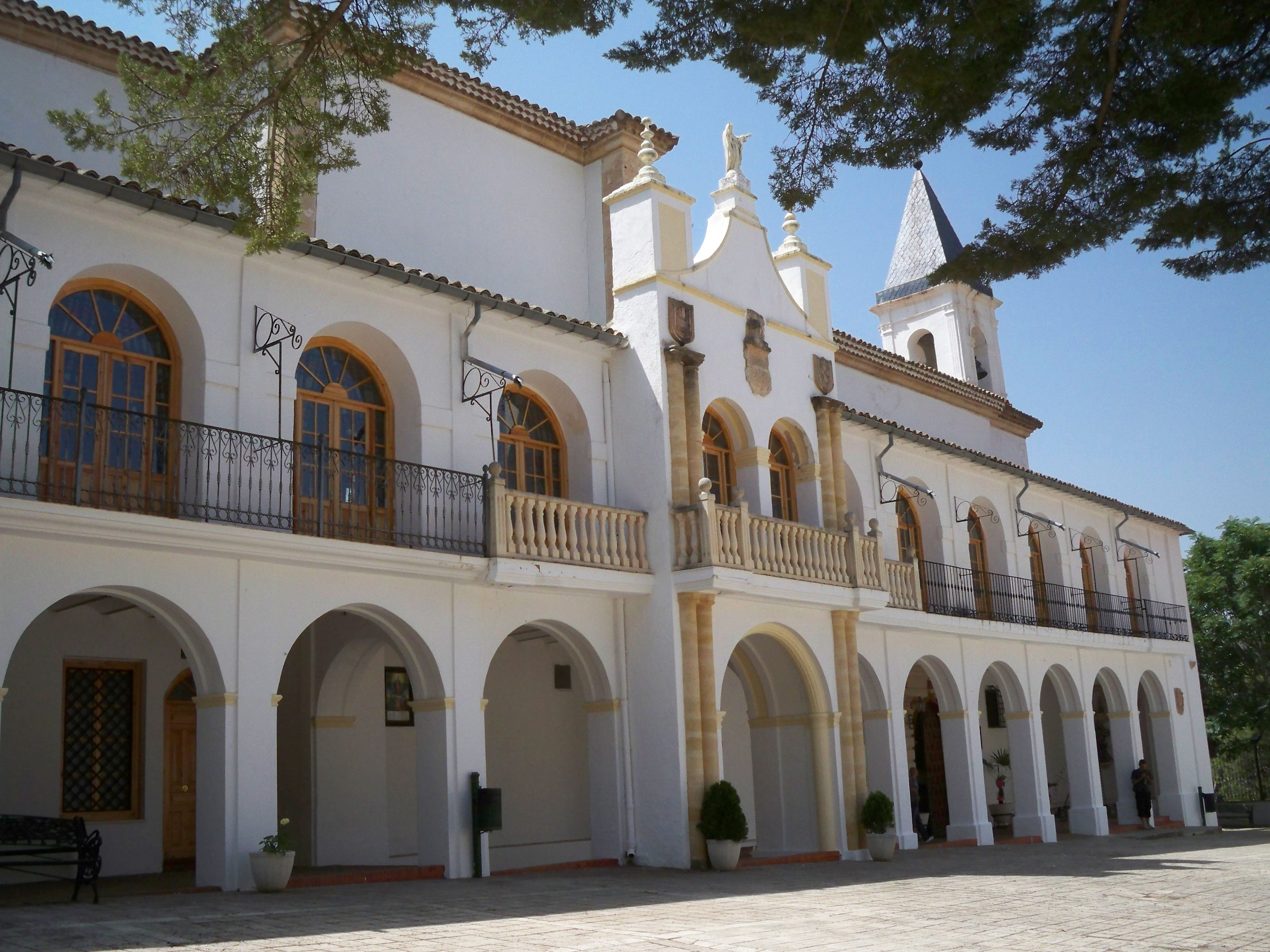
- Interior of the shrine

- Location within Spain

Location
- Interactive map of Royal Monastery and Shrine of Our Lady of Cortes

The Royal Monastery and Shrine of Our Lady of Cortes is a shrine located in the Spanish municipality of Alcaraz, in the Province of Albacete within Castilla-La Mancha. It was the site of the signing of Treaty of Alcaraz.

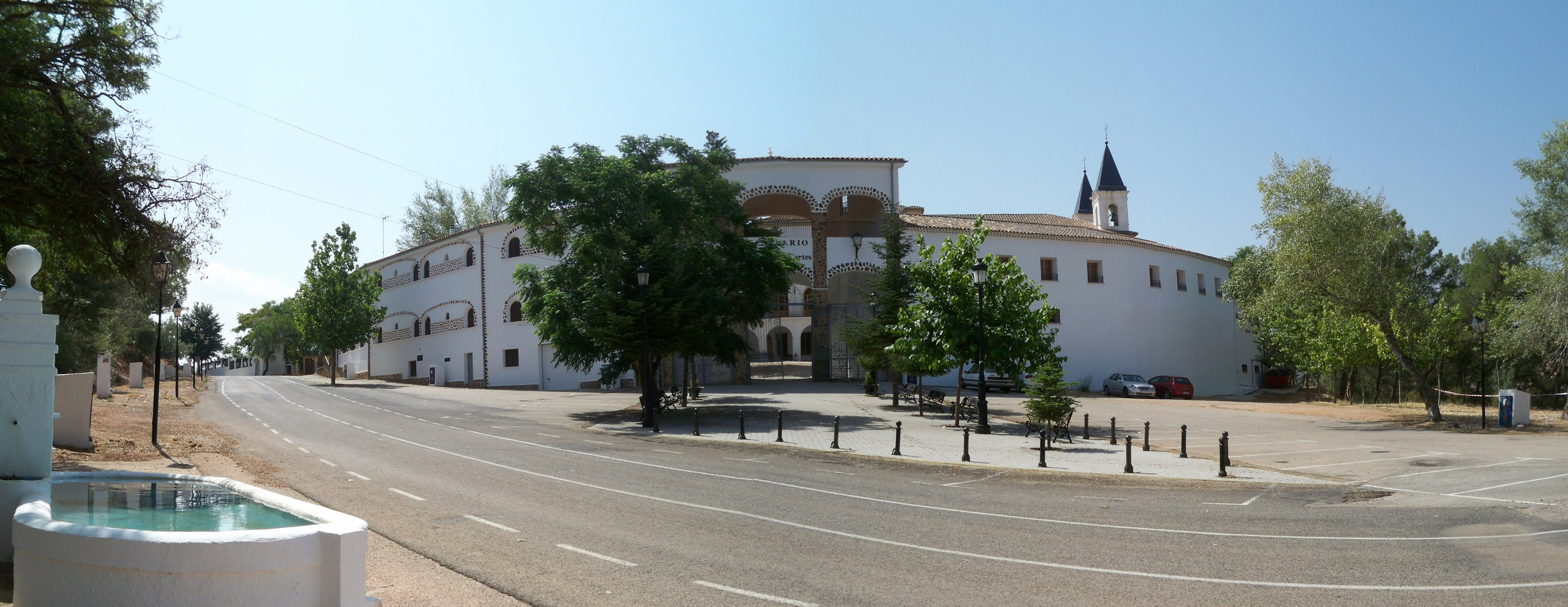
Panoramic view of the shrine

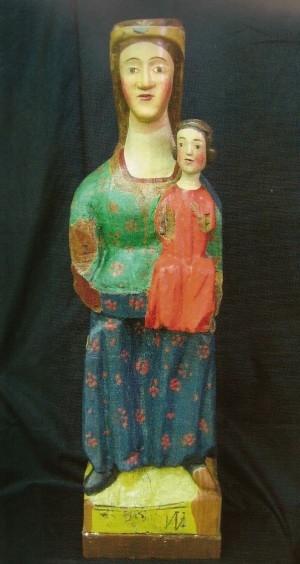
Sculpture of the Virgin of Cortes

The shrine is situated on a dominant hill northwest of Alcaraz, approximately four kilometers (two miles) from the town. According to popular tradition, its name derives from the supposed meeting of the Courts of Castile and Aragon in this location in 1265, during an encounter between Alfonso X of Castile and James I of Aragon.

The shrine houses a revered image known as Our Lady of Cortes, and three annual pilgrimages are celebrated in her honor. In 1988, proceedings were initiated for its designation as a Bien de Interés Cultural (Site of Cultural Interest).

As part of the celebrations for the eighth centenary of the apparition of the image of Our Lady of Cortes, a series of activities were planned.

== Bibliography ==
- Torres Jiménez, Mª Raquel (2013). "Hermitages and Popular Religiosity: The Sanctuary of Cortes". In Aurelio Pretel Marín (coord.) (ed.). Alcaraz. Del islam al concejo castellano [Alcaraz - From Islam to the Castilian Council] (in Spanish). Alcaraz: City Council of Alcaraz, Institute of Albacete Studies. pp. 187–214. ISBN 84-616-4732-7.
