= Qasaba of Murcia =

Coordinates: 37.9832°N 1.1280°W

The Qasaba of Murcia was the military headquarters of the Emirate of Murcia. After the conquest by Castille it became a church and later part of a Templar hospital, and is now the San Juan de Dios museum.

Traditional historiography (later confirmed through archaeological excavations) already suggested the existence in Al-Andalus of a vast palatial-military complex or citadel (qasaba) in this area of the city. Within its walls stood both the palace or official residence for the monarch or governor (qasr) and a small oratory, baths, and a rawda or pantheon, as well as other buildings linked to the court.

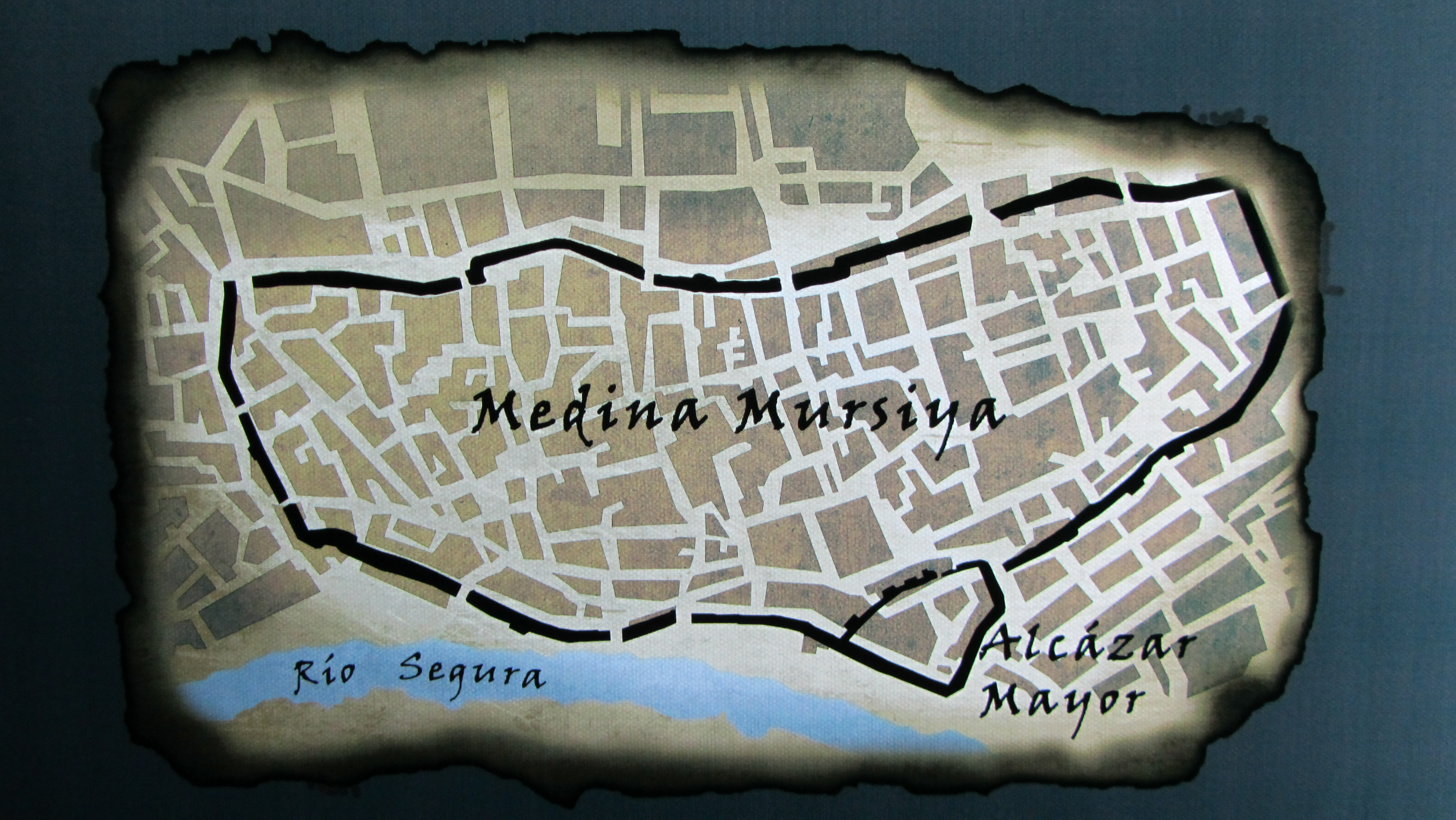
Depiction of the Alcázar Mayor in relation to medieval Murcia and its arrabales

The Emirate of Murcia became a protectorate of the Crown of Castile under the Treaty of Alcaraz in 1243. As a result, Prince Alfonso (future Alfonso X) entered the city on May 1 of that year, taking possession of the Alcázar Mayor. Meanwhile, the Muslim royal family members, who were still nominally "kings of Murcia," relocated with a growing proportion of the Muslim population to the Al Qasr al-Sagir (Alcázar Menor) in the Arrixaca suburb.

This complex was later granted by James I of Aragon to the primary adelantado of Murcia, Alfonso García de Villamayor, after the Aragonese king suppressed the Mudejar revolt of 1264-1266. This marked the end of the protectorate and the application of the right of conquest over the city.

A church was established here some time after 1243.
