= Timeline of Cartagena, Spain =

The following is a timeline of the history of the city of Cartagena, Spain.

== Ancient and Medieval ==
- 243 BCE - Kart-hadasht founded by Carthaginian Hasdrubal the Fair (approximate date).
- 209 BCE - Battle of Cartagena (209 BC). and renamed Carthago Nova by the victorious general Scipio Africanus
- 100-200 CE - Roman Catholic Diocese of Cartagena established.
- 425 CE - City sacked by the Vandals.
- 1243 - Sacked again by Ferdinand III of Castile.
- 1276 - James I of Aragon in power.
- 1289 - Catholic see relocated from Cartagena to Murcia.

== Early Modern ==
- 1585 - Sacked again by an English fleet under Sir Francis Drake.
- 1643 - 3 September Battle of Cartagena (1643).
- 1691 - Cofradía del Socorro (Cartagena) founded.
- 1706 - 21 September: Battle of El Albujón in El Albujón during the War of the Spanish Succession.
- 1758 - 28 February: Battle of Cartagena (1758).
- 1762 - Hospital de Marina de Cartagena built.
- 1779 - Iglesia de Santa María de Gracia (Cartagena) (church) built.
- 1782 - Arsenal de Cartagena built.
- 1786
  - Semanario Literario y Curioso de Cartagena begins publication.
  - Parque de Artillería de Cartagena built.

== 19th century ==
- 1810 - Academia de Caballeros Guardias Marinas built.
- 1823 - Sociedad Económica de Amigos del País de Cartagena established.
- 1842 - Population: 33,593.
- 1844 - Scene of warfare again.
- 1854 - Plaza de toros de Cartagena (bullring) opens.
- 1860 - Population: 54,315.
- 1861
  - Eco de Cartagena newspaper begins publication.^{(es)}
  - Casino Círculo Cartagenero active.
- 1863 - Railway begins operating.
- 1870 - Population: 26,000. (approximate figure)
- 1873 - July: Canton of Cartagena declared.
- 1874 - (12th Jan) Cartagena was occupied by government troops.
- 1887 - El Mediterráneo newspaper begins publication.
- 1898 - Cartagena suffered from the maritime disasters of the Spanish-American War.
- 1900
  - Fábrica de Fluido Eléctrico Hispania built.
  - Population: 99,871.

== 20th century ==
- 1905 - Real Club de Regatas de Cartagena founded.
- 1907
  - 16 May: International Pact of Cartagena takes place in city.
  - Palacio consistorial de Cartagena (city hall) and Estación de Cartagena (railway station) built.
- 1908 - Post Office built on the Plaza de Valarino Togores.
- 1910 - Casa Zapata built on Alameda de San Antón.
- 1912 - Club de Regatas built.
- 1916 - Gran Hotel de Cartagena built on Calle de la Jara (Cartagena).
- 1919 - Cartagena Club de Fútbol formed.
- 1925 - Estadio de El Almarjal (stadium) opens.
- 1935 - Noticiero de Cartagena newspaper begins publication.
- 1939 - March: Cartagena Uprising of nationalists during the Spanish Civil War.
- 1940 - UD Cartagenera (football club) formed.
- 1943 - Museo Arqueológico Municipal de Cartagena (museum) established.
- 1970
  - Nuevo Teatro Circo (theatre) opens.
  - Population: 146,904.
- 1972 - Festival de Cine de Cartagena begins.
- 1980 - Festival de Jazz de Cartagena begins.
- 1981 - Population: 172,751.
- 1982 - Cartagena becomes part of the autonomous community of the Region of Murcia per the Murcian Statute of Autonomy.
- 1986 - Museo Naval de Cartagena (museum) opens.
- 1987 - Tele Cartagena (television) begins broadcasting.
- 1988 - Estadio Cartagonova (stadium) opens.
- 1995
  - Estación de autobuses de Cartagena (bus depot) built.
  - FC Cartagena (football team) formed.
- 1997 - Museo Histórico Militar de Cartagena (museum) opens.
- 1998 - Universidad Politécnica de Cartagena established.

== 21st century ==
- 2005 - Escombreras power plant built in the Port of Cartagena.
- 2007 - Museo Nacional de Arqueología Subacuática (museum) built.
- 2008 - Museo del Teatro Romano de Cartagena (museum) opens.
- 2011
  - Auditorio y palacio de congresos El Batel (convention centre) opens.
  - Population: 215,757.
- 2015 - 24 May: Murcian municipal election, 2015 and Murcian parliamentary election, 2015 held; José López Martínez elected mayor.

== See also ==
- Cartagena history
- History of Cartagena, Spain
- List of mayors of Cartagena, Spain
- History of Region of Murcia

Other cities in the autonomous community of the Region of Murcia:^{(es)}

- Timeline of Murcia
- List of municipalities in Murcia province

== Bibliography ==
=== in English ===
- Josiah Conder (1830), "Carthagena", The Modern Traveller, London: J.Duncan
- William Smith, ed. (1872) [1854]. "Carthago Nova". Dictionary of Greek and Roman Geography. London: John Murray. hdl:2027/hvd.ah5cuq.
- John Lomas, ed. (1889), "Cartagena", O'Shea's Guide to Spain and Portugal (8th ed.), Edinburgh: Adam & Charles Black
- Richard Ford (1890), Handbook for Travellers in Spain, vol. 2 (7th ed.), London: J. Murray, p. 456
- Richard Stephen Charnock (1894), "Cartagena", Bradshaw's Illustrated Hand-book to Spain and Portugal, W.J. Adams & Sons, OCLC 36885426
- "Cartagena (Spain)" . Encyclopædia Britannica. Vol. 5 (11th ed.). 1910. pp. 412–413.
- "Cartagena", Spain and Portugal (4th ed.), Leipzig: Karl Baedeker, 1913, p. 318, hdl:2027/uc2.ark:/13960/t5q81nw29 – via HathiTrust

=== in Spanish ===
- Gregorio Vicent y Portillo (1889). Biblioteca historica de Cartagena (in Spanish). Madrid.
- Isidoro Martínez Rizo (1894). Fechos y fechas de Cartagena (in Spanish) – via Ministerio de Cultura y las Comunidades Autónomas, Biblioteca Virtual del Patrimonio Bibliográfico.
- Federico Casal Martínez (1930). Historia de las Calles de Cartagena (in Spanish).
- Historia de Cartagena (in Spanish). Murcia: Ediciones Mediterráneo. 1986. ISBN 8485856449. (2 vols.)
- Francisco Javier Pérez Rojas (1986). Cartagena, 1874-1936 (transformación urbana y arquitectura) (in Spanish). Editorial Regional de Murcia. ISBN 978-84-7564-038-9.
- Carmen María Cremades Griñán (1996). "Cartagena". Urbanismo en la edad moderna: la región de Murcia (in Spanish). Universidad de Murcia. pp. 97–106. ISBN 978-84-7684-704-6.
- Juan Manuel Abascal Palazón; Sebastián F. Ramallo Asensio (1997). La ciudad de Carthago Nova: la documentación epigráfica (in Spanish). Universidad de Murcia. ISBN 9788483710036.
- "Cartagena Histórica", Cartagena Histórica Cuaderno Monográfico (in Spanish), ISSN 1696-991X 2002-
