= Al-Andalusian palatial complex and neighborhood of San Esteban =

Archaeology site in San Esteban, Spain

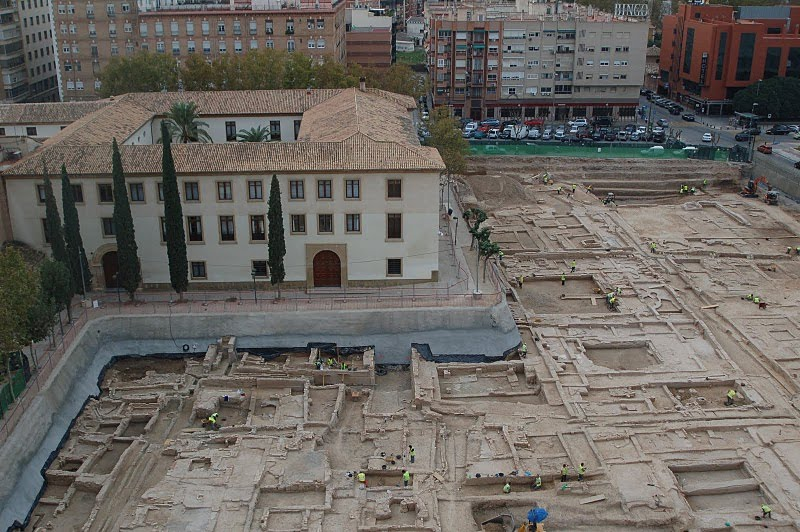
View of the archaeological site, December 2009. Days before the holder of the court number One of Murcia ordered the precautionary cessation of the works of clearing the archaeological site located in the Garden of San Esteban.

The Al-Andalusian palatial complex and neighborhood of San Esteban is an archaeological site that was in the Arrabal de la Arrixaca Nueva, now in the center of Murcia (Region of Murcia, Spain). This exceptional archaeological site of 10,143 square metres is located in the old Garden of San Esteban, next to the building Palacio de San Esteban. It is allowing archaeologists to document the evolution of this urban space from Islamic times to the present, although the excavation process is still unfinished and, as yet, missing archaeological data for its final evaluation. The site is the remains of large country residences, palaces, extensive gardens, and a religious sector with a necropolis and an oratory or small mosque.

== History ==
The archaeological discovery relates mainly to the structure of the Islamic neighborhood of the 13th century, with some visible elements belonging to the 12th century, and possibly the late 11th century. Within the archaeological site is one of the medieval arrabals of the city, known as Arrabal of la Arrixaca Nueva (of the North). Arrabal can be variously translated as slum, outskirts, or outer suburb. The standard conception of this arrabal is that of a space occupied by almunias (country residences) located on the outskirts of the city. These farms were important agricultural holdings that produced substantial produce, and were surrounded by lush recreational gardens.

With the Christian reconquest all this changed. In 1243, the Christian king Ferdinand III of Castile made Murcia a protectorate. Christian immigrants poured in from almost all parts of the Iberian Peninsula. Christian immigration was encouraged with the goal of establishing a loyal Christian base. These measures led to the Muslim population revolt in 1264, which was quelled by James I of Aragon in 1266, who brought more immigrants with him. The local Muslim population were quickly moved as the Christian population began to dominate the former medina.

== Archaeological discovery ==
The archaeological excavation has slightly changed this previous view. It now seems the onset of the demographic pressure in the arrabal of la Arrixaca Nueva goes back at least to the 12th century. There was a gradual spread from the walls of the medina (located in the street Santa Teresa) and from its main exit routes, and thus rose certain political or residential centers. Excavations in the past in the Palacio de San Esteban allowed under this intuit the existence of a palace of the Islamic era. This palace would generate the proliferation of urban spaces in their immediate environment, which are those that have come to light in the excavations of the garden of San Esteban.

The urban layout of Murcia is well known by the excavations of the last two decades that have documented all the plots affected by urban renewal. What we find in San Esteban exists in the entire city of Murcia. Analyzed individually and from a purely architectural standpoint, the houses in the excavation show a level of medium-low quality construction, within the range usual for plots excavated in the urban area of Murcia. What gives greater significance to the remains found in this place is the possibility of having an overview of an urban space of large dimensions.

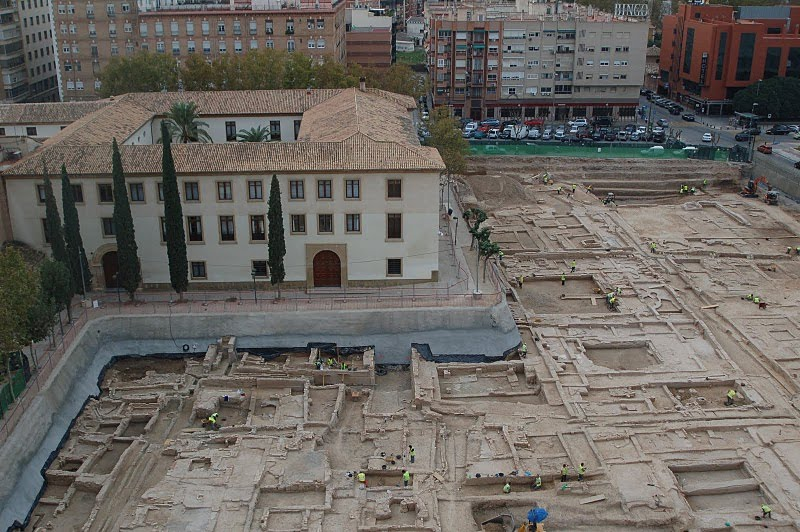
Partial view of the Al-Andalusian palatial complex and neighborhood of San Esteban archaeological site in December 2009.

== The observation of the site ==
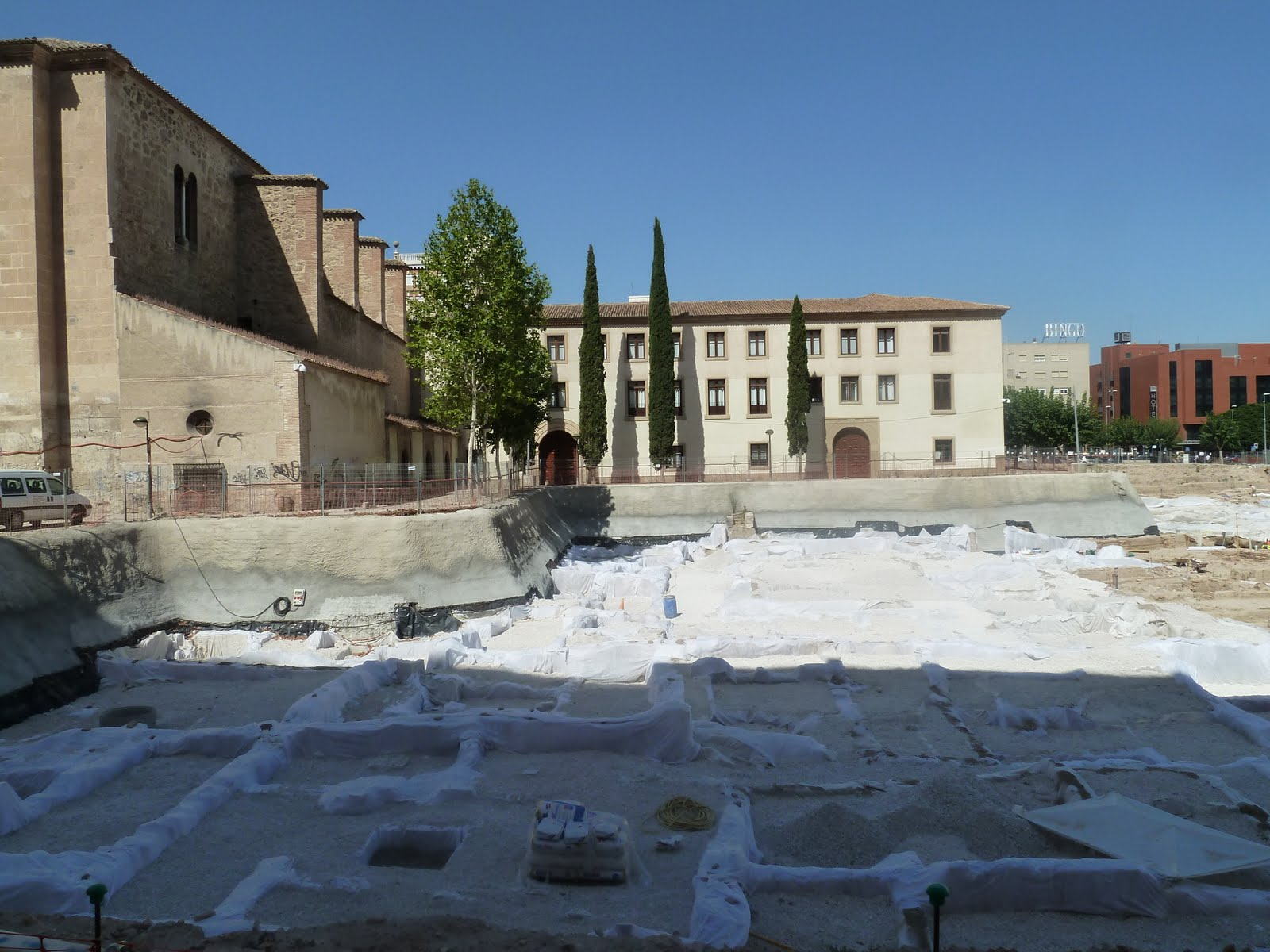
View of the archaeological site, September 2010. Conservation process carried out by a private company contracted of the conservation works archaeological site of San Esteban.

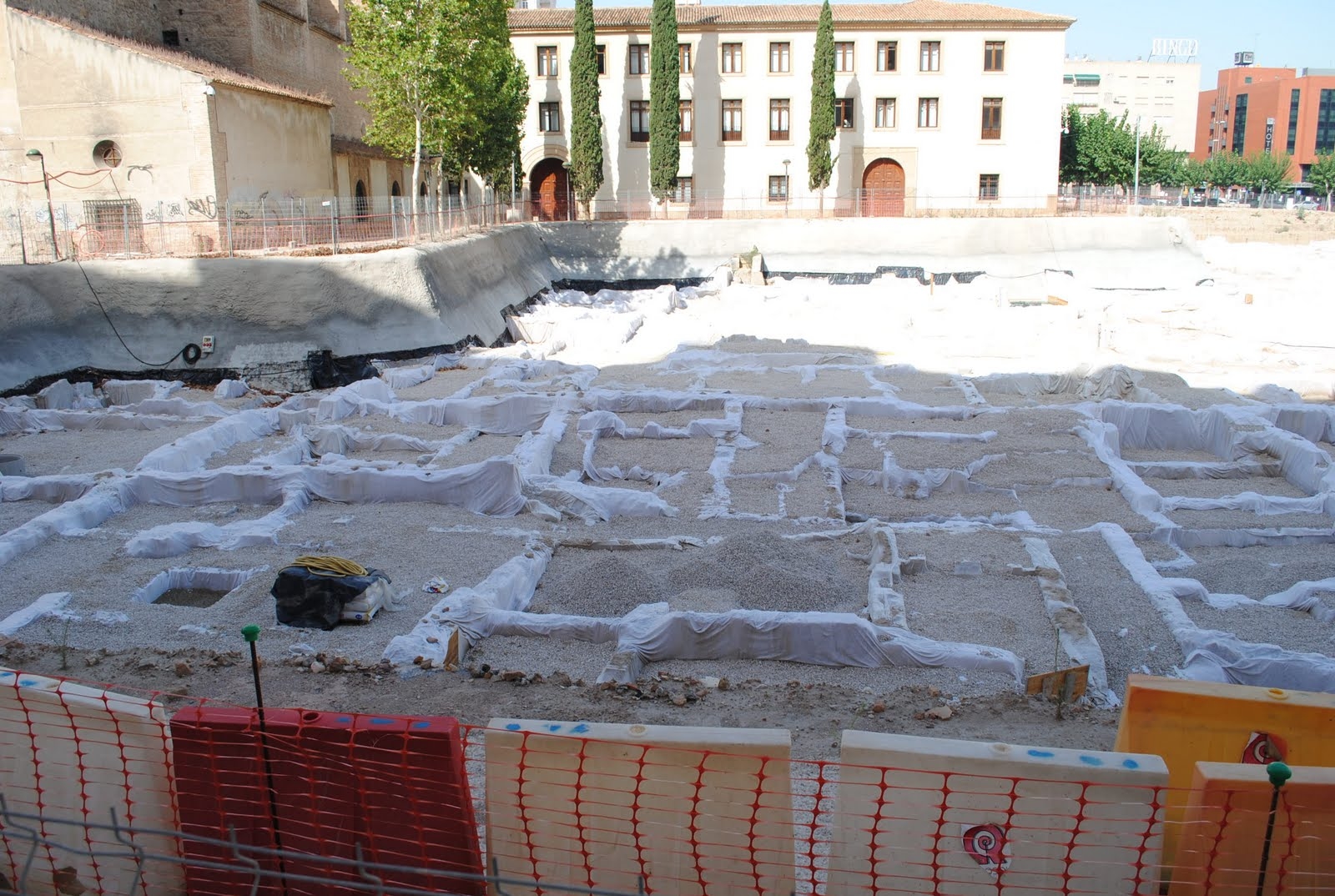
View of the archaeological site, September 2010. First it proceed to the cleaning and maintenance of all surfaces and structures of the site, where herbicides are applied to prevent the proliferation of plants after temporary preservation treatment. The works also include the consolidation of structures with lime mortar and the consolidation of lime pavements with reference of mortar of restoration, which preserves the pavement edges. In addition, it preserves the remains with a layer of geo-textile to separate the archaeological layers of the gravel that protect the site. Are also signaled the most important structures and the major roads.

The fact of having a free space to begin with allowed urban planning with streets of prominent proportions and features within the city of Murcia. This urban structure, as is usual in the Islamic medina, presents a clear infrastructure and management of drains connected to a public sewer system. This aspect is lost with the Christian conquest of the city, and Murcia would not recover public infrastructure of waste water until well into the 20th century.

Despite the modesty of the building materials, the floors of the houses reflect the characteristic Islamic models, with landscaped central courtyards, the main room located to the north, and the twisted entrance from the street to reinforce the intimacy of the house. This gives it a typological value, as an example of the traditional Islamic Murcian housing of 12th-13th century, archetype to the best Classic and Mediterranean tradition.

Palatial facilities: although not palaces as such, compared to a palace such as Monasterio de Santa Clara la Real, these houses are of large-scale and therefore correspond to a wealthy class, possibly of senior officials related to the palace that would be located under the current Palacio de San Esteban. In some cases it may be thought, by its typological parallels, in its relation with other public buildings, such as a "funduk" (inn) or a "madrasa" (school).

Along with housing, the existence of a religious sector is remarkable, located in the northwest corner of the area under excavation, with an area of necropolis and maybe an oratory or small mosque relatable to the neighborhood at the end of the 13th century.

== Outcome of the excavations ==
The City Hall of Murcia promoted the development of an underground car park in the area occupied by the Garden of San Esteban. The archaeological finds led them to study and propose different ways of preservation of the remains that were appearing. They came to consider the possible removal, consolidation and subsequent relocation of the Islamic neighborhood in the same place, but at ground level.

The treatment of the archaeological remains is defined in the Special Plan for the Historic Complex of Murcia. This Special Plan, by order of the Directorate General of Fine Arts and Bienes Culturales of the Regional Government, sets out the requirements prior to licensing for the works of the car park. The extension of the maintainable remains to virtually all of the affected area for the planned car park eventually led the Regional Government to rule out the planned construction of the underground car park.

The change of the project paralyzed the archaeological excavations, which were financed by the construction company. The company took up a new project whose priority was the conservation and museology of the excavated archaeological complex and the area still to be excavated.

The Directorate General proceeded to initiate the declaration of the archaeological remains found in the "Garden of San Esteban", a Bien de Interés Cultural (BIC), process which is currently pending on the required reports of the consultative institutions.

During the transition period, the task is to: define the final project, the steps to take towards it, collect all necessary data; address the consolidation, conservation and restoration measures of the remains; and define the museological elements, phases and criteria. This technical process has the support of a multidisciplinary committee created for that purpose by the Directorate General of Fine Arts and Cultural Assets.

A committee of experts, in the words of the Minister of Culture and Tourism, has been chosen for "their professionalism, prestige and for the specific Islamic period dating the remains." At the moment, because it is not closed, the list includes:

- Antonio Malpica Cuello, professor of Medieval History at the University of Granada.
- Rafael Pardo Prefasi, specialist architect in the restoration of heritage.
- Jorge Eiroa, professor of the University of Murcia, specialist in medieval archeology.
- José María Luzón, professor of archeology of the Complutense University of Madrid.
- Juan Francisco Jiménez Alcázar, director of the Center for Medieval Studies of the University of Murcia.
- Emilio Estrella, Dr. Engineer of Roads, Channels and Ports, and member of the Academia Alfonso X El Sabio, student of the ancient Murcia.
- Carmen Pérez, director of the Institute of Restoration of the Valencian Community.
- Ricardo Mar, professor of archeology of the University Rovira i Virgili of Tarragona.

== Citizen movement ==
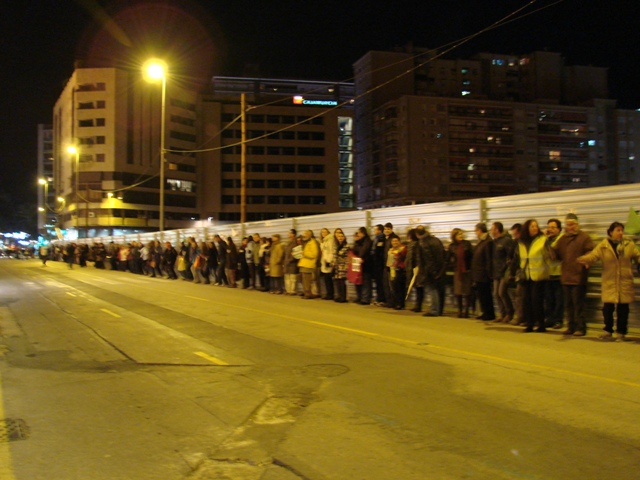
Abrazo (Embrace) to the site of San Esteban.

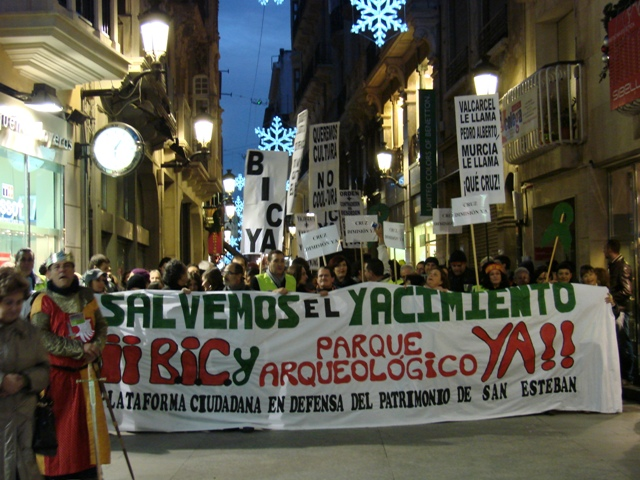
Manifestation of 19 December 2009.

On 27 November 2009 a group of around 300 artists, writers, and painters gathered in the Plaza Mayor of Murcia. The outcome was the "Manifesto for San Esteban". The group made the decision to move to the Seprona and denounce the events that were happening at the archaeological site, Complaints continued on successive days and led to the precautionary cessation of the works of clearing the archaeological site.

From then on there was more popular awareness of the site and a groundswell against the construction of the underground car park in San Esteban. Carlos Rodríguez Ibáñez (Socialist councilor in the City Hall of Cehegín and spokesman of the Grupo Municipal Socialista) created a Facebook group in defense of the site under the title "Yacimiento de San Esteban", which in a few days had more than 20,000 members. Press, radio and television echoed any news on the archaeological site referencing the Facebook group and the number of followers of the group. At that time, the teacher Javier García del Toro (Professor of prehistory of the University of Murcia) convened meetings every Sunday in the vicinity of the site to sensitize the public to the importance of the archaeological discovery. He gathered those present in a human chain in what was called "Abraza San Esteban" (Embraces San Esteban).

The movement of citizens led to a public platform called "Plataforma Ciudadana" in defense of the site with the slogan "Abraza San Esteban". They protested dressed with green jackets and umbrellas to remind authorities that the site had been abandoned to the inclement weather. Platform members chained themselves to the site and gathered in other areas of Murcia to report the state of abandonment of the site.

On 19 December 2009 a demonstration convened with about 5,000 people, starting from the City Hall of Murcia through the streets of this city, ending at the San Esteban site. There was read the "Manifesto for San Esteban"

== Articles on the site ==
- Gold mine (12/08/2009) (in Spanish)
- Archaeological site yes, underground parking car no (12/10/2009) (in Spanish)
- Manifesto (12/19/2009) (in Spanish)
- Red Heritage List (01/12/2010) (in Spanish)
- 61 days of abandonment (02/09/2010) (in Spanish)
- Exhibition on the site (28/04/2010) (in Spanish)
- Guided visits (04/30/2010) (in Spanish)
- Covering of San Esteban (07/30/2010) (in Spanish)
- Contests of ideas (07/08/2010) (in Spanish)
