= Historic-artistic =

In Spain, the historic-artistic is a legal statement that gives assets declared as historical-artistic monuments in a given locality the protection of Spanish cultural goods, which is regulated by the Ministry of Culture of Spain.

== See also ==
- Bien de Interés Cultural
