= Archaeological Museum of Murcia =

- Museo Arqueológico de Murcia
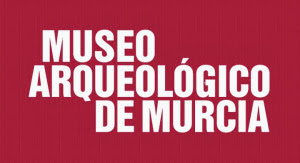

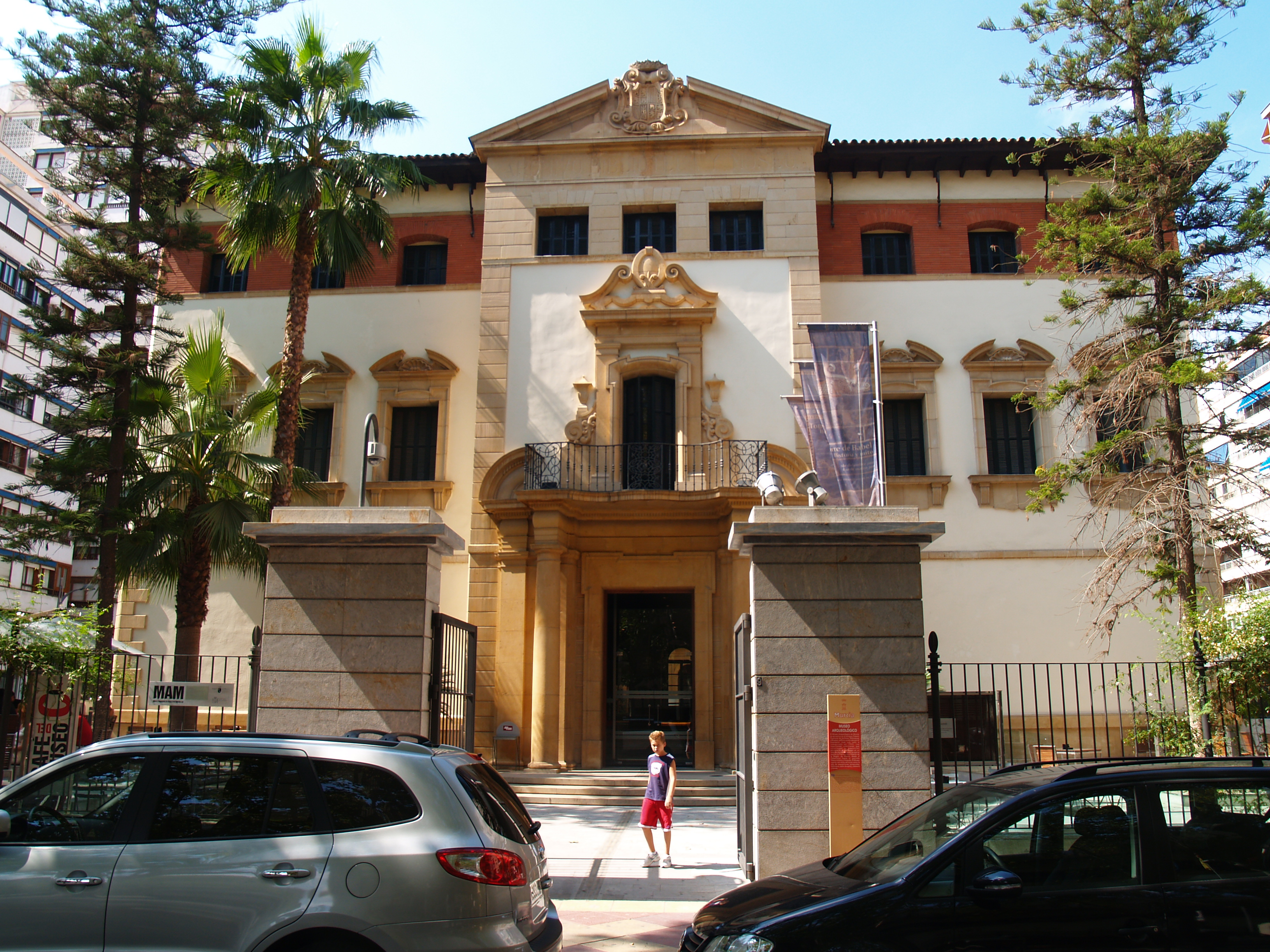
- Museum's facade
- Established: 1864
- Location: Murcia, Spain
- Coordinates: 37°59′23″N 1°07′50″W
- Type: Archaeological museum
- Owner: General State Administration

The Archaeological Museum of Murcia (Spanish: Museo Arqueológico de Murcia; MAM) is a State-owned archaeological museum in Murcia, Spain.

== History ==
The Museum of Antiquities of Murcia was created by means of a 6 July 1864 royal order, constituted as an added section to the Museum of Painting and Sculpture, created earlier in the year. In 1910, the museum moved to a new building designed by Pedro Cerdán. In the 1950s, the museum moved again to its current premises, also known as Casa de la Cultura. The Spanish State transferred the museum's management to the Murcia's regional administration in 1984, while retaining its ownership. In 1962, the building was declared a Monument Historical-Artistic.

== Exhibitions ==
The permanent exhibition consists of 16 rooms, which contain sections on prehistory, the Paleolithic, and the Bronze Age. There is also a room on Iberian history, which contains "one of the most important Spanish collections of Iberian art".

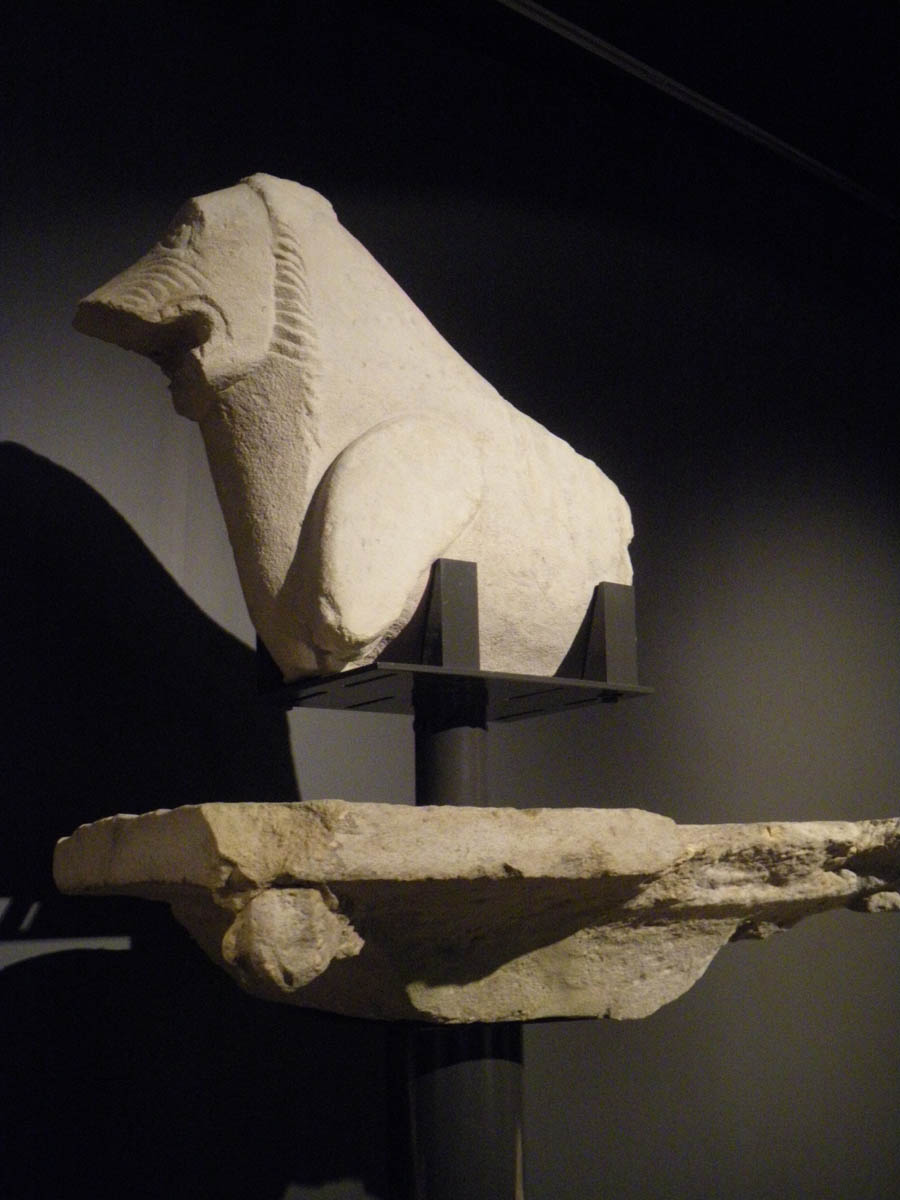
Lion of Coy (2nd half of the 1st millennium BC)

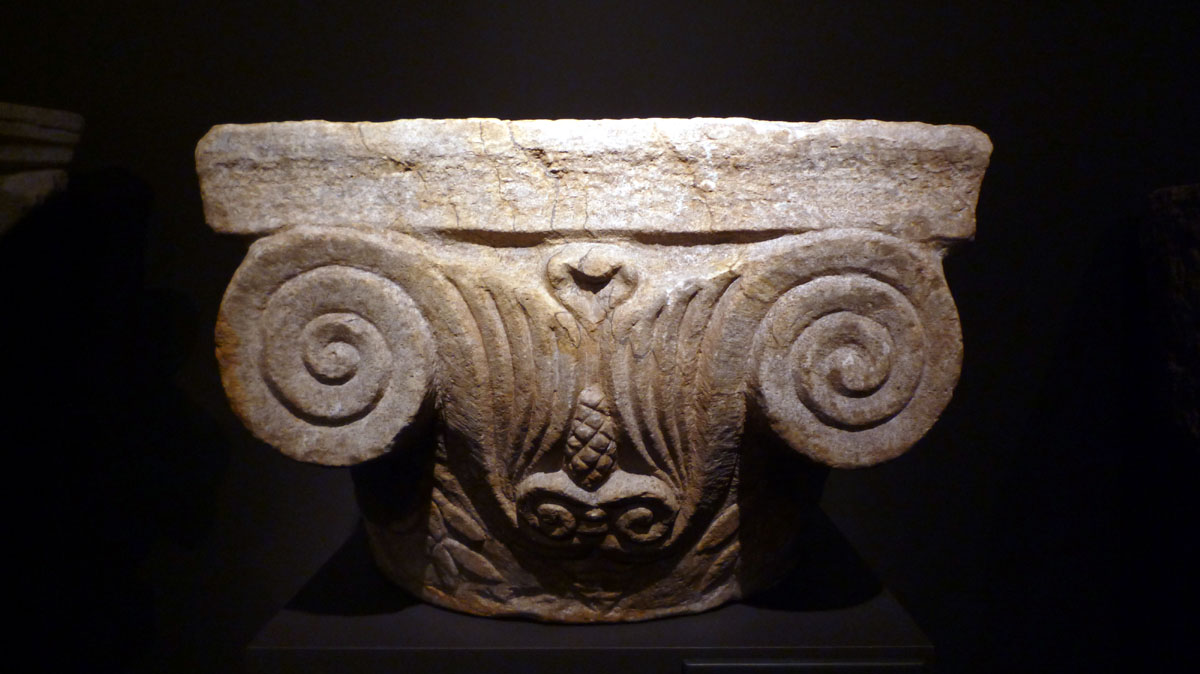
Ionic capital found in the Roman vila of Huerta del Paturro (Portmán, La Unión)

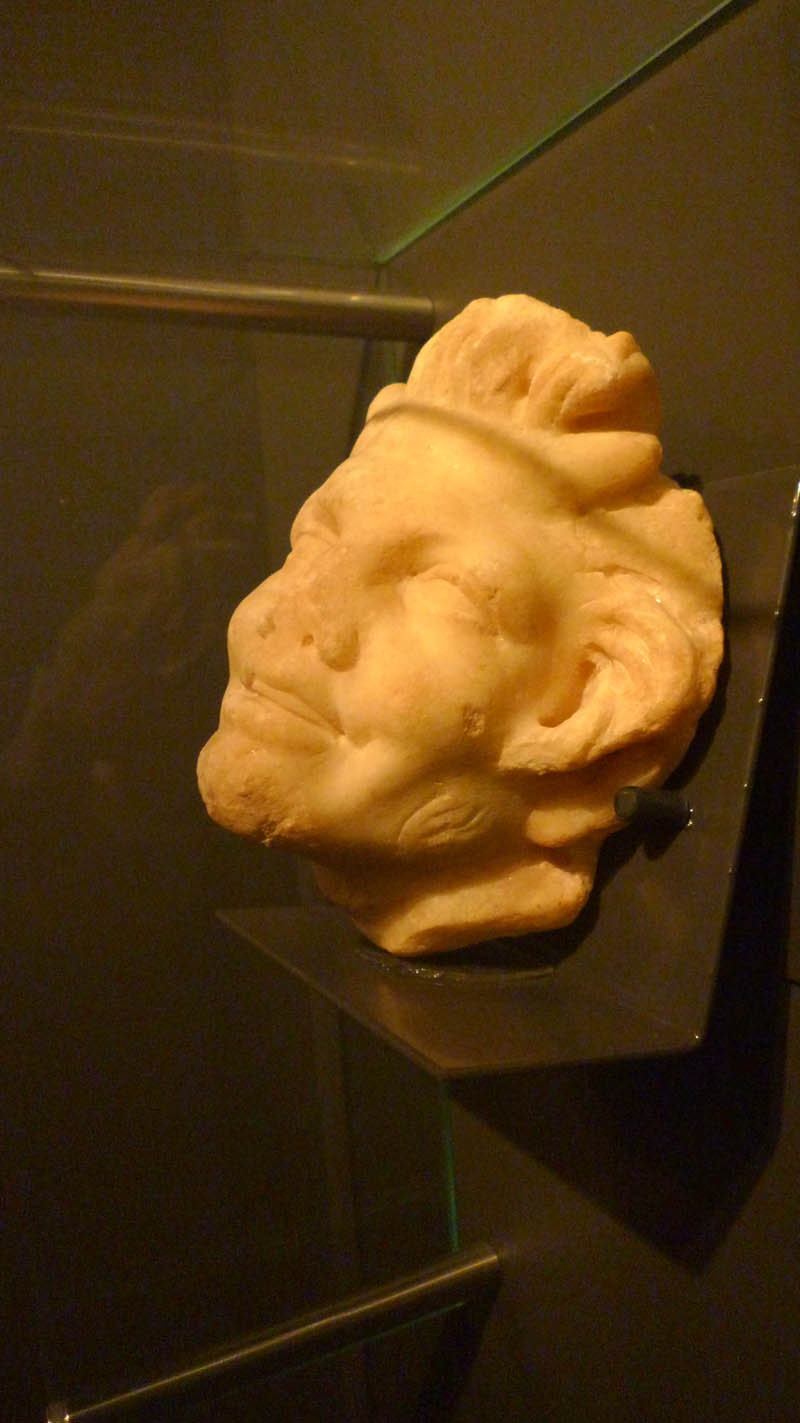
Satyr's head from Huerta del Paturro, Portmán.
