= Guadalupe, Murcia =

Guadalupe
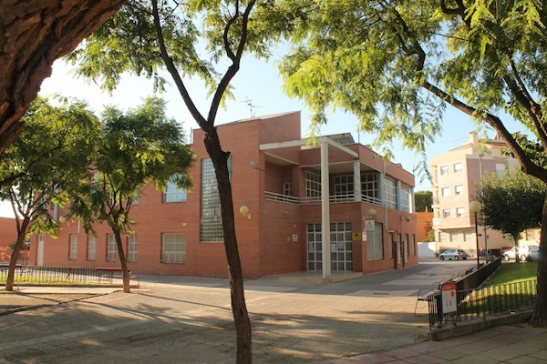
- Interactive map of Guadalupe
- Coordinates: 38°0′N 1°11′W
- Autonomous community: Murcia
- Province: Murcia
- Comarca: Huerta de Murcia
- Judicial district: Murcia
- Municipality: Murcia

Area
  - Total: 6,008 km^{2} (2,320 sq mi)
- Elevation: 57 m (187 ft)

Population (2011-01-01)
  - Total: 6,242
  - Density: 1.039/km^{2} (2.691/sq mi)
- Time zone: UTC+1 (CET)
  - Summer (DST): UTC+2 (CEST)

Guadalupe is a pedanía (village/suburban district) in the municipality of Murcia in the Region of Murcia, Spain. The main populated area is known as Guadalupe de Maciascoque.

El Escorial Murciano, the complex that contains the Universidad Católica San Antonio de Murcia and the Monasterio de los Jerónimos de San Pedro de la Ñora, an historic Hieronymite monastery, is located here.

Historically, in the Middle Ages, Guadalupe was home to a Jewish community until the expulsion of the Jews in 1492.
