= Conquest of Murcia (1265–1266) =

Aragonese military campaign in Iberia

- Part of the Mudéjar revolt of 1264–1266
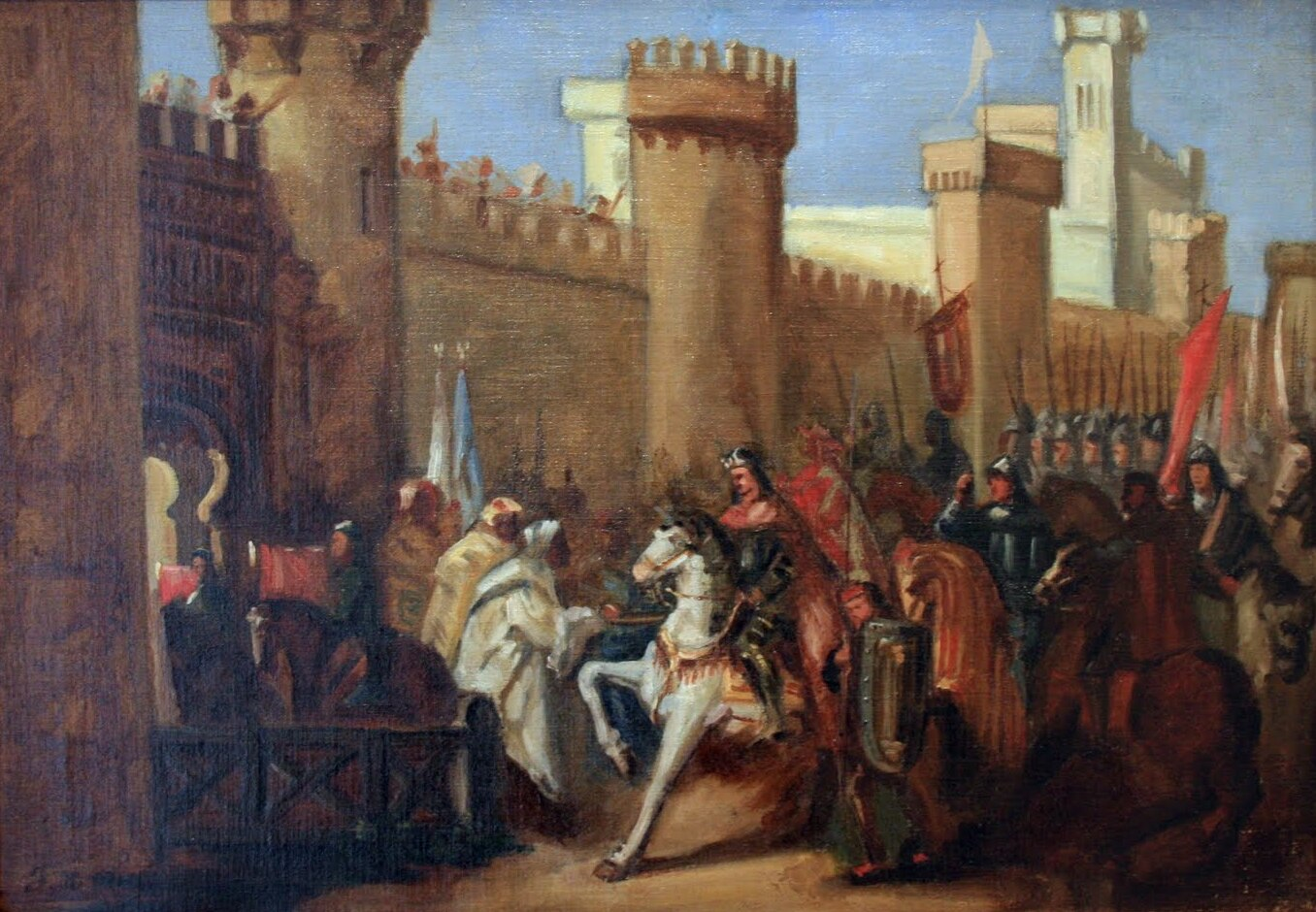
- James I of Aragon entering the city of Murcia after the surrender of its inhabitants, February 1266
Date	1265–1266
Location	Murcia, Taifa of Murcia
Result	Aragonese victory
Territorial changes	Murcia lost its independence and was annexed by Castile.

Belligerents
Aragon; Castile; Order of Santiago	Taifa of Murcia; Emirate of Granada

Commanders and leaders
James I of Aragon; Manuel of Castile; Paio Peres Correia	Al-Wathiq of Murcia; Abdallah ibn Ali

King James I of Aragon conquered the Muslim-held Taifa of Murcia on behalf of his ally King Alfonso X of Castile in 1265–1266.

Under the Treaty of Alcaraz in 1243 Murcia was a semi-independent vassal of Castile, but renounced its allegiance during the Mudéjar revolt of 1264–1266. Aragon entered the war on Castile's side after Castile's Queen Violant—who was James' daughter—wrote a letter asking for her father's help.

After initial negotiations with his nobles, James marched from Valencia at the end of October 1265. Subsequently, Aragonese troops took multiple Murcian towns and defeated a reinforcement column sent by the Emirate of Granada. The siege of the city of Murcia started in January 1266, ending in its surrender on 31 January and James' entrance to the city on 3 February.

After the conquest, Murcia was returned to Castile and lost its semi-independent status. Subsequently, its Muslim population was moved to suburbs as Castile brought Christian settlers to populate the region.

== Background ==
In the first half of the thirteenth century, Castile and Aragon conquered multiple Muslim states in southern Spain. Murcia, a major power centre in the southeast, surrendered on 2 April 1243 to Infante Alfonso, the future Alfonso X of Castile. After this conquest, the Taifa of Murcia became a semi-independent vassal of Castile, ruled by the Baha al-Dawla of Banu Hud. Under this arrangement, Murcia still had its own army, bureaucracy, and coins, but its rulers had to submit as Alfonso's vassals. Baha al-Dawla remained loyal to Alfonso X, despite his policy of supporting Murcia's Christian population. Baha al-Dawla was succeeded by his son, Abu Ja'far in 1259, who died after a few years and replaced by his son Muhammad. Muhammad was soon deposed by his cousin Abu Bakr ibn Hud, also known as Al-Wathiq. By this time, Sultan Muhammad I of the neighboring Emirate of Granada had consolidated his power and territories to become another regional power, even though nominally also under Castile's sovereignty.

== Rebellion ==
In late July or August 1264, the Muslim population ("Mudéjars") of Lower Andalusia started a rebellion against Castile, beginning in Jerez and spreading to other towns. The rebellion was partly caused by Castile's oppressive forcible relocation policy against the Muslims, as well as by instigation from Muhammad I of Granada. Muhammad I renounced his allegiance to Castile and attacked as well. Multiple settlements and castles, including Jerez itself, fell to the rebels or Granadan troops.

Murcia joined the rebellion as well. The Murcians expelled Castilian troops from its alcázar (castle), and al-Wathiq declared allegiance to Muhammad I. Muhammad I sent troops to help Murcia led by his Banu Ashqilula ally, Abdallah ibn Ali. Abdallah might have taken power in Murcia before the Murcians reinstated al-Wathiq at some point during rebellion.

== Aragonese offensive ==
=== Preparation ===
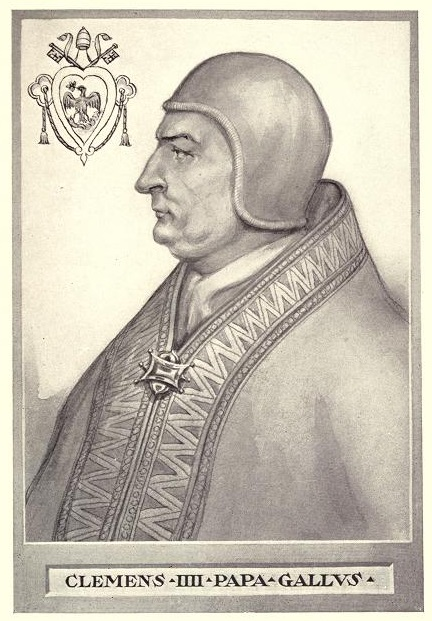
Pope Clement IV authorized James I to collect tithes to fund the war.

Initially the task to suppress the revolt passed to Alfonso's brother Manuel and Grand Master Paio Peres Correia of the Order of Santiago. Concerned that Castile was fighting on three fronts, Alfonso X asked his wife, Queen Violant to request help from her father, James I of Aragon. James I agreed and summoned his parliaments to support the war. The Catalan Courts agreed to raise taxes for the campaign in July 1264, but the parliament for his other dominion, Aragonese Corts initially rejected the campaign when they met in November. James I spent the next following months trying to convince the Aragonese lords. In May 1265, the Archbishop of Tarragon and the Bishop of Valencia began preaching for crusades. Pope Clement IV allowed James to collect tithe from his dominions for up to three years to fund the crusade. Infante Peter (future Peter III of Aragon) carried out initial raids against the rebels in late summer of 1265.

=== Invasion of Murcia ===
James I marched with his troops from Valencia at the end of October 1265. He kept his army close together and advanced through Muslim-held towns. In turn, the Muslims of Villena, Elda, Petrer, Orihuela surrendered to him, with terms that they were allowed to keep their lands and worship freely.

James now prepared to march on the city of Murcia itself and was joined by Castilian troops under Infante Manuel. At the same time Granadan troops, numbering 800 cavalry and 2,000 men-at-arms, marched to relieve the city. James moved to intercept this column and the Granadans were routed in a battle.

In early December, James met with Alfonso X in Alcaraz, on the border between Castile and James' Kingdom of Valencia, to coordinate their war efforts. On 2 January 1266 James marched from Orihuela and started the siege of the city of Murcia. Skirmishes broke out between the defenders and the besiegers. Outnumbered and cut off from reinforcements, the city defenders asked for terms. James offered to ask Alfonso to restore the Murcians' legal rights from before the rebellion: self-government under Castilian suzerainty, freedom of worship, and preservation of lands and properties. They agreed to this offer but requested Alfonso's explicit agreement rather than just James' promise to ask him. James refused to get Alfonso's agreement before the city surrendered.

Finally the city surrendered on 31 January. James' standards were raised in the city and he was said to have kneeled down and kissed the ground to thank God when he saw this. James himself entered the city on 3 February, formally accepting the city's surrender from al-Wathiq.

== Aftermath ==
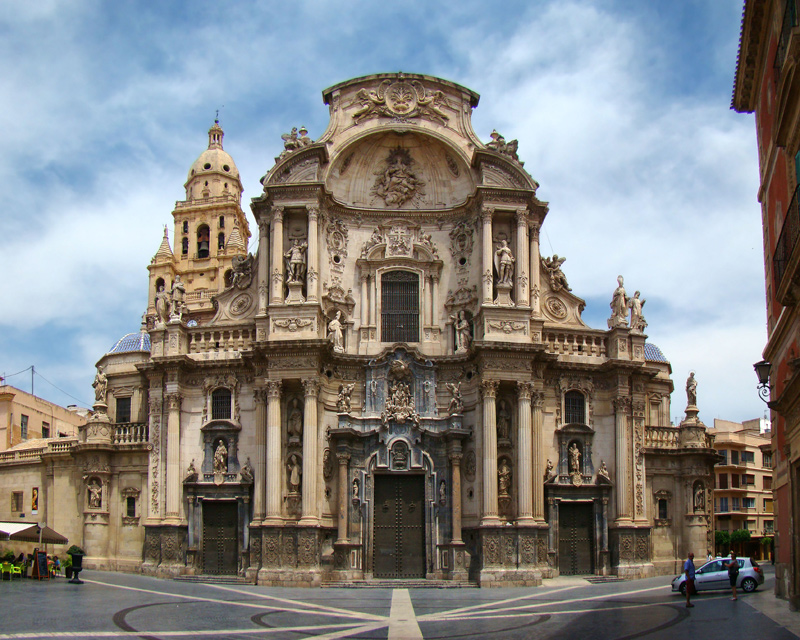
After the conquest of Murcia, James I took over the city's mosque and consecrated it as a church. Today it is the site of the Murcia Cathedral (pictured).

After the city's surrender, James and his troops moved in and occupied the city's castle as well as the area between it and the gate facing James' original encampment. The Aragonese took over a mosque next to the castle—in contravention to the terms of surrender. When the Muslim citizens protested, James said that there were ten other mosques in the city, and that he did not wish to hear the Muslim call to prayer in the castle where he took up residence. He also threatened to sack the town. The Muslims relented; James then transformed the mosque into a church and dedicated it to the Virgin Mary. Afterwards he entered the church, where he cried emotionally and his priests held mass. James and his army stayed in Murcia until March 1266. He returned to his realm, handing over the city to the Castilians. On 23 June, the city formally renewed its allegiance to Castile's king Alfonso X, and requested his pardon for the rebellion.

Effectively, Murcia's defeat meant that it was no longer self-governing under Muslim rule, but ruled directly by the Castilians. The rights of the Muslims guaranteed by the terms of surrender turned out to be weakly enforced. In the city, Muslims were only allowed to live in a suburb called Arrixaca, and other Muslim citizens were compelled to move there. A wall was constructed between the Muslim suburb and the rest of the city, and the Muslims were given freedom of religion in their suburb. Al-Wathiq was given lands and lived there in exile, in his place Abdallah ibn Hud was appointed as the leader of the Muslims, with the title "King of the Moors of Arrixaca in Murcia", rather than "King of Murcia" before the rebellion. The rest of the city were confiscated and assigned to Christians: settlers were brought from other parts of Castile to populate it. Castile implemented similar efforts in other towns in the area. Alfonso stayed in Murcia between February 1271 and fall 1272, supervising the colonization of the region and establishing a new administration by Christians. He granted the fuero to Murcia and a number of other towns.
