= Arrixaca =

Arrixaca (later San Esteban) was an arrabal (suburb) of Murcia, although it is now in the centre of the expanded city. It is the site of the Al-Andalusian palatial complex and neighborhood of San Esteban.

== Etymology ==
The name may have Basque-Navarrese origins, similar to place names like Arriyaga, Arrillaga, Arrixaga, or Arrixaca. Linguistically, it could mean "place of stones.

== History ==
=== Islamic Era ===
This residential area had access to water from the Acequia Mayor Aljufía irrigation canal. In medieval times, the canal ran along the northern side of the walled city of Murcia, outside the Arab Walls of Murcia. This facilitated the development of Arrixaca, where wealthy Andalusian families established their almunias thanks to the availability of water. It is no coincidence that rulers like Ibn Mardanis (12th century) and Ibn Hud (13th century) built their recreational palaces in this area, drawing water directly from the Aljufía.

The former patroness of Murcia, Our Lady of Arrixaca is housed in the Church of San Andrés. One theory suggests that the image was located in a chapel in the Arrixaca suburb, where being outside the city walls non Muslims such as Italian Christian silk traders from Pisa and Genoa were allowed to live and worship. At the time, Murcia was one of the Mediterranean's main silk producers.

=== Castilian Protectorate ===
When the Taifa of Murcia became Castile's protectorate in 1243 the Muslim royal family members, who were still nominally "kings of Murcia," relocated from the centre of Murcia to the Al Qasr al-Sagir in Arrixaca. A growing proportion of the Muslim population followed them to the suburb as Murcia was Christianised by immigrants from across Iberia with the goal of establishing a loyal Christian base.

The Christian population of the town became the majority, with Muslims increasingly confined to Arrixaca. This led to a Muslim revolt in 1264, which was quelled by James I of Aragon in 1266, who brought further Aragonese and Catalan immigrants with him. The revolt effectively nullified any obligations that Alfonso had to honor the treaty's terms.

=== Muslim Enclave ===
The failure of the rebellion had disastrous consequences for Muslims in Murcia. Effectively, Murcia's defeat meant that instead of being a self-governing Muslim protectorate of Castile it was ruled directly by Castile with some bits allocated to Aragon.

The rebellious territories endured mass expulsions and Christians were paid to settle formerly Muslim lands with mosques reconsecrated as churches. Unlike in Andalusia, the large Muslim population in the city of Murcia remained with their religious rights guaranteed, but were forced to move to Arrixaca with houses and lands within the city were divided among Christian settlers. Over time, Alfonso further reduced the portion of lands allocated to the Muslims and moved in settlers from other parts of Castile to replace them.

Muslim rights guaranteed by the terms of surrender were weakly enforced. A wall was constructed between the Muslim suburb and the rest of the city, and the Muslims retained freedom of religion in their suburb. A new leader of the Muslims was appointed with the title "King of the Moors of Arrixaca in Murcia", in contrast to the pre rebellion "King of Murcia".

=== Muslim Emigration ===
However, many of its Muslim inhabitants emigrated to the still Muslim Granada, so that by 1272, two Catholic parishes, San Miguel and Santiago, were established in the northern part of the arrabal, later called Arrixaca Vieja. The continued depopulation of the Morería of Murcia led to the foundation of the parish of San Andrés in 1293, in what became known as Arrixaca Nueva.
