= Alcaraz, Spain =

Alcaraz
- Municipality
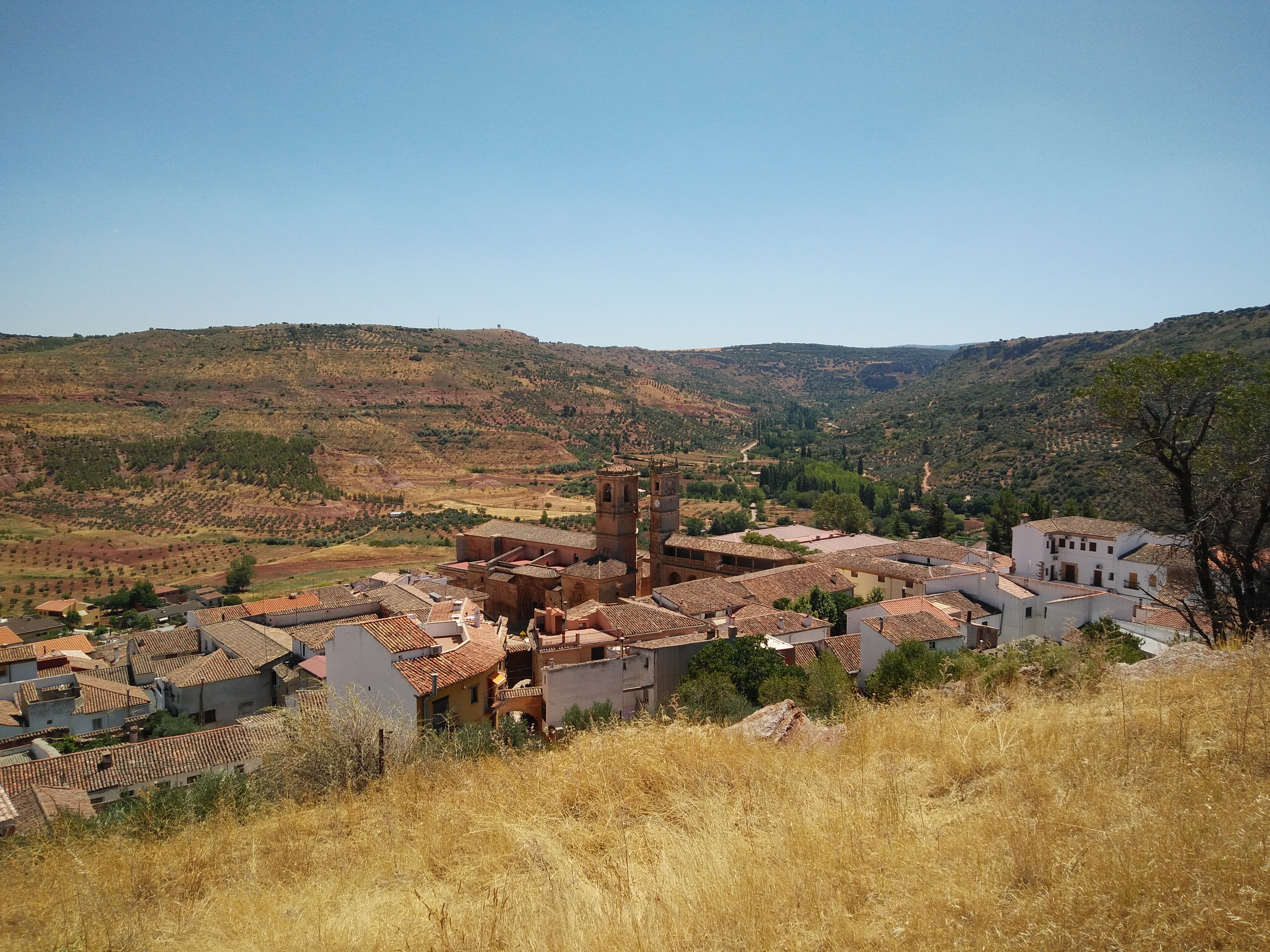

- Coat of arms

- Location in Spain Alcaraz (Castilla-La Mancha)
- Coordinates: 38°40′5″N 2°39′34″W
- Country: Spain
- Autonomous community: Castilla–La Mancha
- Province: Albacete

Area
  - Total: 370.53 km^{2} (143.06 sq mi)
- Elevation: 953 m (3,127 ft)

Population (2025-01-01)
  - Total: 1,283
- Time zone: UTC+1 (CET)
  - Summer (DST): UTC+2 (CEST)
- Postal code: 02300
- Dialing code: (+34) 967 38 ** **
- Website: Official website

Alcaraz is a municipality of Spain located in the province of Albacete, Castilla–La Mancha. The municipality spans across a total area of 370.53 km^{2}. The locality lies at 953 metres above mean sea level.

== History ==
Alcaraz was incorporated to Christian domain in 1213.

The town was granted the status of city in 1429, by means of the concession of a royal privilege. The urban oligarchy controlling political power and riches in the later Middle Ages was formed by a mix of the nobleza hidalga (descended from knights-villein) and the so-called caballeros cuantiosos. The Alcaraz's extensive municipal territory during the Middle Ages had decreased fivefold by the end of the 16th century, after the emancipation of several hamlets, and it was further decimated in the ensuing years.
