= Treaty of Alcaraz =

- Type: Protectorate agreement
- Signed: April 2, 1243
- Location: Alcaraz, Crown of Castile
- Parties: Alfonso X of Castile (on behalf of Ferdinand III of Castile) and the Muslim noble families of the Emirate of Murcia
- Language: Medieval Spanish, Arabic

The Treaty of Alcaraz was an agreement signed in Alcaraz around April 2, 1243, between Alfonso of Castile – the future Alfonso X – acting on behalf of Ferdinand III of Castile, and several representatives of the Muslim noble families of the Emirate of Murcia.

== The treaty ==
The Hudid Emirate of Murcia suffered internal instability following the assassination of Ibn Hud in 1238. By early 1243, the emir of Murcia, Muhammad ibn Muhammad ibn Hud Baha al-Dawla, faced a dual threat from the Order of Santiago and the Nasrid Kingdom of Granada. Pressured by these dangers, he proposed vassalage to Castile, sending his son as an emissary to Burgos.

The treaty was signed in April 1243 at the Shrine of Our Lady of Cortes in the Castilian town of Alcaraz, The treaty established a Castilian protectorate over the Emirate of Murcia, including the following terms:

- The Murcian rulers accepted vassalage to the Castilian monarch.
- Castilian troops would occupy the fortresses of the region.
- Castile would collect a portion of the region's taxes.
- In return, the Muslim population's religious practices and property rights would be respected.
- Muslim governors would be allowed to continue governing under Castilian oversight.

== Subsequent events ==
The cities of Lorca, Mula, and Cartagena refused to accept the treaty. Lorca and Mula were conquered in 1244, while Cartagena fell to Alfonso in the spring of 1245, with the naval assistance of a fleet from the Cantabrian coast.

Christians became a majority within the city as immigrants came from all parts of Iberia with Muslims confined to the suburb of Arrixaca. The Mudéjar revolt of 1264-1266 in the Kingdom of Murcia effectively nullified any obligations that King Alfonso X "the Wise" had to honor the treaty's terms.

== Bibliography ==
- Carrión Gutiérrez, José Miguel (1997). Conociendo a Alfonso X el Sabio. Editora Regional de Murcia. ISBN 8475641938.
- Guichard, Pierre (2001). Al-Andalus frente a la conquista cristiana: los musulmanes de Valencia, siglos XI-XIII. Universitat de València. ISBN 8470308521.
- Martínez Díez, Gonzalo (2002). "Las villas marítimas castellanas: origen y régimen jurídico." In El Fuero de Laredo en el octavo centenario de su concesión. Universidad de Cantabria. ISBN 8481023035, pp. 45–86.
- Molina López, Emilio (1981). "El gobierno de Zayyân B. Mardanîs en Murcia (1239-1241)." Miscelánea Medieval Murciana, vol. 7, pp. 157–182. ISSN 0210-4903.
- Molina López, Emilio (1986). "Por una cronología histórica sobre el Šarq Al-Andalus (s. XIII)." Sharq al-Andalus, no. 3, pp. 39–55. ISSN 0213-3482.
- Torres Fontes, Juan (1995-1996). "Del tratado de Alcaraz al de Almizra. De la tenencia al señorío (1243-1244)." Miscelánea Medieval Murciana, vol. 19-20, pp. 279–302. ISSN 0210-4903.
- Torres Fontes, Juan (2002-2003). "Alcaraz y la cantiga CLXXVIII." Alcanate: Revista de estudios Alfonsíes, no. 3, pp. 255–270. ISSN 1579-0576.
