= El Valle and Carrascoy =

The Regional Park of El Valle and Carrascoy encompasses much of the Cordillera Sur in the Murcia Region of Spain. It is a protected natural area that serves as the green lung of the region.

The park is recognized for its natural beauty, environmental quality, and rich archaeological, historical, and cultural heritage, making it a popular destination for hiking, mountain sports, guided tours, and heritage visits.

Notable sites within the park include:

- La Luz Visitor Center
- Wildlife Recovery Center
- Fuente de Columbares Environmental Center and Hostel
- Recreational areas of Cresta del Gallo and Valle Perdido
- Arboretum
- El Verdolay, an archaeological site in La Alberca
- Gastronomic Ecomuseum of Beniaján
- Byzantine Basilica of Algezares
- Sanctuary of Our Lady of Fuensanta, in Algezares
- Monastery of La Luz, in Santo Ángel
- Monastery of Santa Catalina del Monte
- Hermitage of San Antonio el Pobre, in La Alberca
- Chapel of Our Lady of Mount Carmel, in Beniaján
- Castle of Los Garres
- Castle of La Luz, in Santo Ángel
- Argaric settlement of Puntarrón Chico, in Beniaján
