= Garres y Lages =

Los Garres
- Pedanía
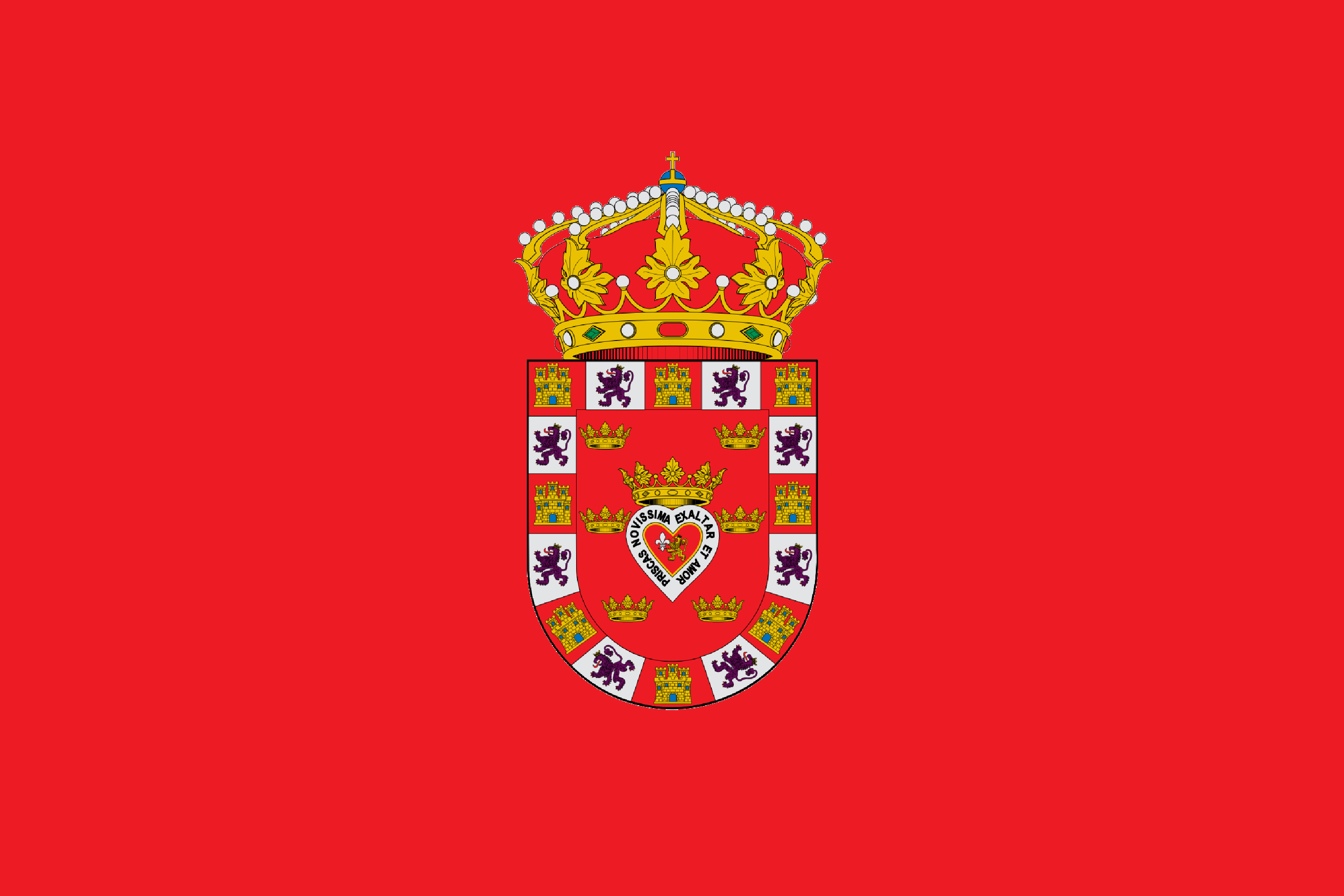
- Flag Coat of arms

- Location in Spain
- Country: Spain
- Autonomous community: Region of Murcia
- Municipality: Murcia

Government
  - Pedáneo Mayor: Antonio Ramírez (Ciudadanos)

Area
  - Total: 5.68 km^{2} (2.19 sq mi)
- Elevation: 50 m (160 ft)

Population (2019)
  - Total: 7,410
  - Density: 436.8/km^{2} (1,131/sq mi)
- Postal code: 30158

Los Garres is a pedanía (sub-municipal entity) of the municipality of Murcia, Spain, located within the Cordillera Sur. It has a population of 7,410 inhabitants (INE 2019) and covers an area of 5.68 km². It is situated approximately 5.5 km from Murcia city at an average altitude of 50 meters above sea level.

== Geography ==
Los Garres is bordered by:

- To the north: Los Dolores
- To the east: San José de la Vega and Beniaján
- To the west: San Benito and Algezares
- To the south: Algezares

== Municipal Government ==
Composition of the municipal board
Party	2015	2019
Party	Seats	Seats
People’s Party (PP)	4	3
Spanish Socialist Workers' Party (PSOE)	2	3
Citizens (Cs)	1	2
VOX (Vox)	-	1
Cambiemos Murcia	1	-
Ahora Murcia	1	-

== History ==
Due to its location at the foothills of the mountains, where water sources and ravines flow, Los Garres has been a suitable site for human settlement since ancient times. Archaeological remains suggest that settlements in the area predate the Muslim invasion, with significant Roman villas and settlements along the northern slopes of the Cresta del Gallo range, between El Palmar and Beniaján.

According to Robert Pocklington, numerous Mozarabic toponyms in the area indicate a pre-Islamic settlement. Historical evidence also points to Roman activity, including a Roman road passing through the Garruchal Pass, which connected Cartagena with Fortuna. Near the Castle of Los Garres, remains of an Ibero-Roman settlement have been discovered. Manuel González Simancas wrote that the Castle of Los Garres dominated a bridle path connecting the Huerta de Murcia to the countryside through the Garruchal Pass.

During the 13th century, historian Juan Torres Fontes documented several significant towers in the Los Garres area, including the towers of García Jufré de Loaysa, Doña Fontaneta, and Don Manuel. By the 15th century, Los Garres was considered a rural hamlet and a part of the city of Murcia. In 1713, it was still listed as a hamlet, referred to as "Garres y Hases" in legal records.

By the late 18th century, it gained the legal-administrative status of an "Aldea de Realengo" (royal village) with a local mayor. Its parish was directly administered by Murcia Cathedral.

During the Three Liberal Years (1820–1823) the town (called Garres ó Lages or Garres y Laxes) was annexed to Algezares, which had its own town hall. At this time, Los Garres had 208 registered heads of households and about 1,086 inhabitants, mostly engaged in agriculture. The majority of the land was irrigated, producing wheat, corn, vegetables, and some olive oil, with silk production being particularly significant.

During the First Spanish Republic, Los Garres played a role in the Cantonal Rebellion, leading to the popular phrase: "Los Garres, Beniaján y Torreagüera, vaya tres pueblecicos si el rey los viera" ("Los Garres, Beniaján, and Torreagüera, what three little towns if the king could see them").

In the 20th century, Los Garres' population grew steadily, reaching 5,267 residents by 1969. Despite an administrative reorganization halving the population in 1970 it reached 6,000 residents in 2007.

The economy is now primarily based on the service sector, followed by industry, construction, and agriculture. Local businesses include sausage production, animal feed manufacturing, and fruit and vegetable processing.

== Festivals ==
- San José (celebrated in the San José neighborhood).
- Patron saint festivals in the last two weeks of October, honoring the Holy Christ of Mercies and Our Lady of the Rosary.
- Cultural Week of the Peña El Caliche (second week of October).

== Culture ==
Los Garres is home to the restorer and nativity scene artist Cayetano Gálvez Serrano. In 2010, he won the first prize from the Association of Nativity Scene Makers of Murcia.

It is the home of the football team UD Los Garres.
