= Cordillera Sur =

Mountainous region in Murcia, Spain

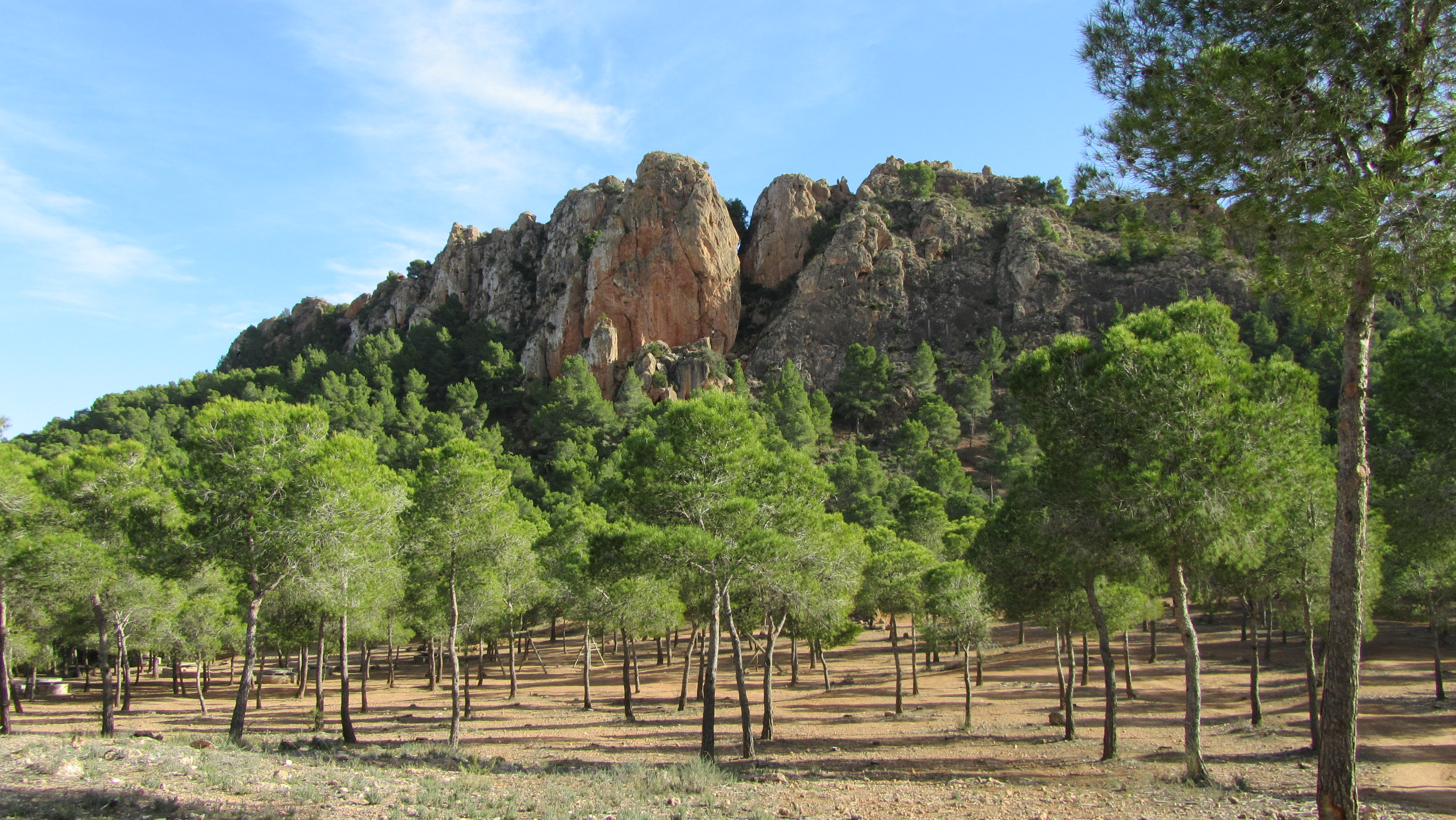
- Cresta del Gallo, part of the Cordillera Sur

Highest point
- Elevation: 600 m (2,000 ft)

Geography
- Country: Spain
- Region: Region of Murcia
- Parent range: Baetic System

The Cordillera Sur (also called Costera Sur) is a mountainous region that forms part of the Huerta de Murcia in the Region of Murcia, Spain. It includes the mountain ranges and foothills that enclose the Valley of the Segura River on its southern flank.

== Municipalities ==
The territory covers the municipalities of:

- La Alberca
- Santo Ángel
- Algezares
- Garres y Lages
- San José de la Vega (also called Tiñosa)
- Beniaján
- Torreagüera
- Los Ramos
- Cañadas de San Pedro

At times, the neighboring towns of Alquerías and Zeneta are also considered part of this area due to their historical ties, though current official boundaries exclude them.

== Geographic features ==
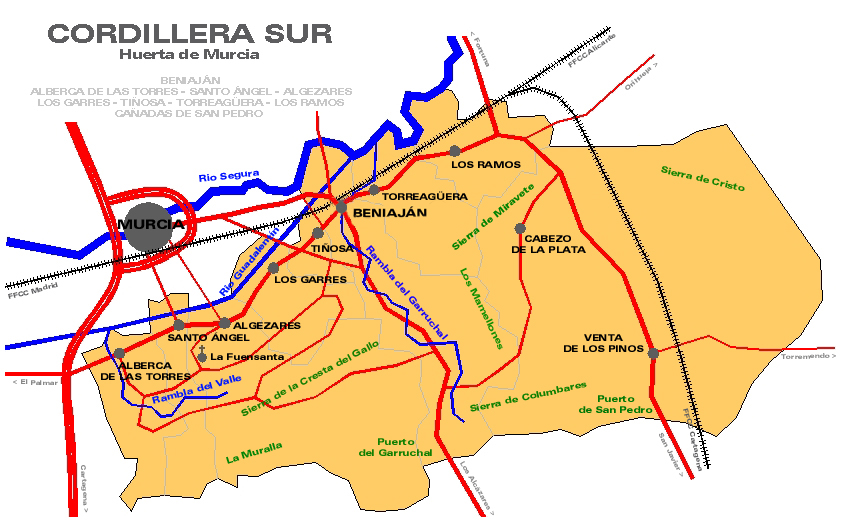
Map of the region

The mountain chain includes notable peaks such as Cresta del Gallo and Columbares, with some peaks exceeding 600 meters in elevation. This range separates the fertile Segura River valley from the plains extending toward the Mar Menor. The main mountain passes allowing access between these regions are La Cadena, Garruchal, and San Pedro.

The landscape varies significantly, featuring:

- Northern slopes, where most settlements are concentrated, adjacent to irrigated agricultural lands
- Mountainous zones, covered with Mediterranean forests on peaks and shaded areas
- Southern slopes, which are arid, featuring the so-called "Lunar Landscape" (Paisaje Lunar)
- Dry farming areas, primarily growing almonds and olives in the mountain passes

The ramblas of Valle and Garruchal, along with numerous seasonal streams and ravines, serve as the region's only watercourses, though they remain dry for much of the year.

== Regional Park of El Valle and Carrascoy ==
Much of the Cordillera Sur falls within the Regional Park of El Valle and Carrascoy, a protected natural area that serves as the green lung of the region. The park is recognized for its natural beauty, environmental quality, and rich archaeological, historical, and cultural heritage, making it a popular destination for hiking, mountain sports, guided tours, and heritage visits.

== Villages and the Huerta ==
The villages of the Cordillera Sur retain a traditional rural character, despite being close to the city of Murcia. Their narrow streets and central squares, often nestled against the mountains, offer scenic views of the Segura valley. While urbanization has increased, many areas still preserve historical agricultural landscapes.

Notable cultural and architectural heritage sites include:

- Parish churches of La Alberca, Algezares and Beniaján
- 19th and early 20th-century mansions, reflecting the wealth generated by agricultural exports
- Sanctuary of La Fuensanta, in Algezares, home to the patron saint of Murcia, Our Lady of Fuensanta

Additionally, the region is home to numerous archaeological sites, such as:

- The Sanctuary of La Luz in Santo Ángel, where ancient ritual basins are still visible.
- A necropolis in La Alberca.
- The Paleo-Christian Basilica of Algezares.

The rural landscapeis dotted with farmhouses (alquerías) and traditional agricultural settlements. Some of the best-preserved river meander farming areas (rincónes) include:

- Rincón de Villanueva, in Beniaján
- Rincón de Gallego, in Torreagüera
- Rincón de Almodóvar, in Los Ramos

These areas maintain traditional orchards of oranges and lemons. Additionally, small hermitages scattered throughout the countryside serve as focal points for local religious festivals, including:

- Virgin of the Huerta
- San Antón de la Cabaña
- Virgin of the Orange Blossom (Virgen del Azahar)
