= Our Lady of Fuensanta =

Principal patron of the city of Murcia, Spain

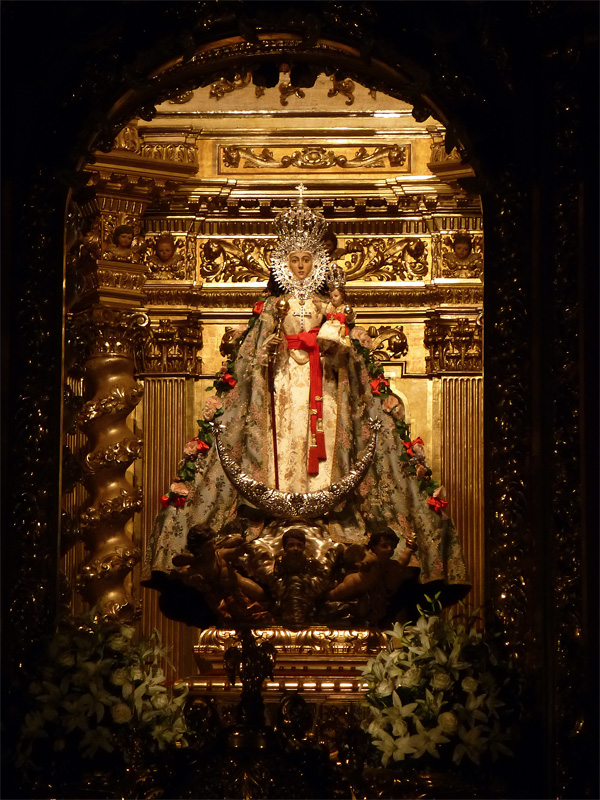
- Our Lady of Fuensanta in the shrine of her sanctuary
- Venerated in: Roman Catholic Church
- Major shrine: Sanctuary of Our Lady of Fuensanta, 17th century, in Algezares, Murcia
- Feast: Sunday following September 8
- Patronage: Murcia

Our Lady of Fuensanta (Spanish: Virgen de la Fuensanta) is a miracle working statue of the Virgin Mary, particularly associated with ending drought. She is the principal patron of the city of Murcia, a title she has held since the first half of the 18th century.

== Sculpture ==
The image is a Gothic sculpture from the 15th century and started as an image of the Annunciation. Originally there was no infant Jesus but that was added in the sixteenth century and is attributed to Francisco Salzillo. It was later modified in the 18th century by the sculptor Roque López.

== Sanctuary ==
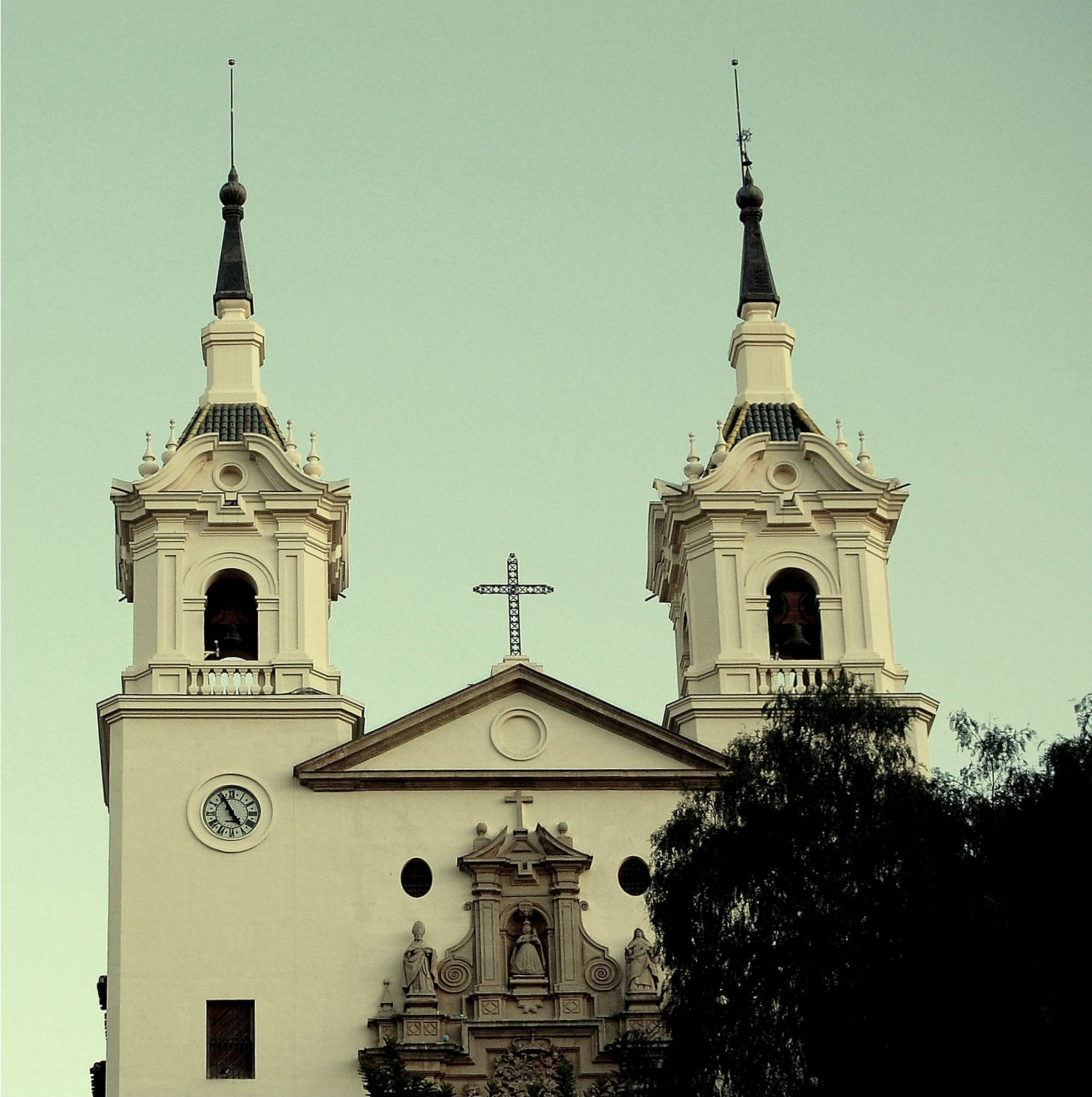
Sanctuary of Fuensanta

The Sanctuary of Our Lady of Fuensanta is located in Algezares, in the mountains bordering Murcia. A hermitage dedicated to the Virgin has existed at the site since the 15th century and was replaced in the late 17th century with a larger Baroque church to accommodate the growing number of devotees. The building underwent various expansions and renovations and needed a major restoration after its partial destruction the Civil War.

== Devotions ==
Her feast day is celebrated on the Sunday following September 8. The image is carried in a religious procession from its Sanctuary to Murcia Cathedral, twice a year, once in Lent and once in September, and afterwards it is returned. The most important procession is the return to the sanctuary after the Murcia Fair in September.

The sanctuary is one of the most visited in Spain, not only as a place of pilgrimage but also due to its scenic location.

== History ==
=== Origin ===
There is a long history of devotion to Our Lady of Fuensanta in Murcia, originating from an apparition of Mary on the El Hondoyuelo mountain about five kilometers from the City of Murcia, which caused a holy spring to form. This area was considered sacred by ancient civilizations.

The image of Our Lady of Fuensanta was one of several Marian images in the area, with worship occurring during the feast of the Annunciation and Christmas. A pilgrimage to the Hospital of San Juan de Dios was occasionally conducted, though never to Murcia Cathedral.

=== Growing Devotion ===
The story of how Fuensanta became one of the most important devotions in eastern Spain begins on January 17, 1694. At that time, after a prolonged drought, the decision was made to bring the image of the Virgin to Murcia for the first time, following the path from Algezares to the Capuchin convent. This pilgrimage was intended to pray for the rain needed for crops, and chronicles of the time state that it rained heavily and even snowed after the supplication.

Marian processions were habitually made during later droughts bringing similar miraculous rains, and Fuensanta quickly gained widespread devotion. In 1731, Our Lady of Fuensanta was officially declared the new patroness of the Murcia and its surrounding agricultural lands. Murcia's previous patroness was Our Lady of Arrixaca, a 13th-century image linked to the Conquest of Murcia in 1243.

=== Patronage ===
Since then, many miracles have been attributed to Our Lady of Fuensanta's intercession, not only concerning rain, which has further strengthened her devotion among the faithful. On May 27, 1808, she was granted the military title of Generala del Reino (General of the Kingdom) during the Napoleonic invasion, a name by which she is still affectionately called by her followers.

On April 24, 1927, she was canonically crowned in a grand ceremony at the Puente de los Peligros before a large crowd. She has also received the Gold Medal from various institutions and associations in both the city and the region, including the City of Murcia and the Superior Council of Brotherhoods.

=== Spanish Civil War ===
In 1936, during the Spanish Civil War, Murcia was under Republican control. This period saw widespread anti-clerical violence, including the burning of the interior of the church which held the image. It was hidden throughout the Civil War. On March 29, 1939, two days before the end of the Civil War, Nationalist troops entered Murcia. The image was carried in procession through Murcia and a radio broadcast announced its safety. The image was temporarily homed in the Civil Government Palace, as Murcia Cathedral was closed. The local bishop officially entrusted the custody of the image to the family that had hidden it during the Civil War, granting them responsibility for their transfers during processions.

== Sources ==
- Antón Hurtado, Josefa M. (1996). De la Virgen de la Arrixaca a la Virgen de la Fuensanta [From Our Lady of Arrixaca to Our Lady of Fuensanta] (in Spanish) (1st ed.). Murcia: University of Murcia, Publications Service. p. 50. ISBN 978-84-7684-687-2.
