= Sanctuary of Our Lady of Fuensanta =

Church in Murcia, Spain

- Santuario de la Virgen de la Fuensanta
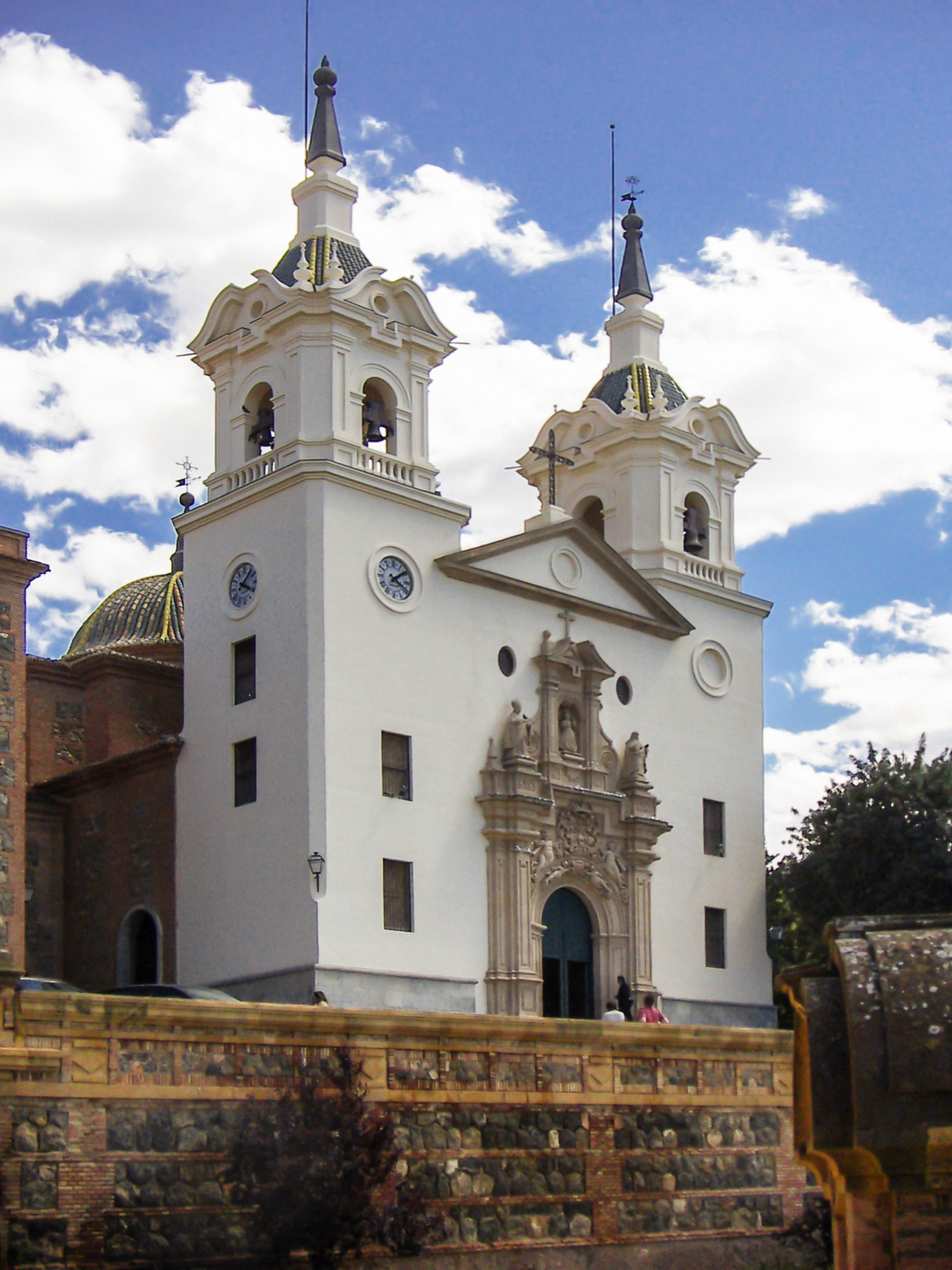
- View of the sanctuary's facade

Religion
- Affiliation: Roman Catholic Church
- Diocese: Diocese of Cartagena
- Ecclesiastical or organizational status: National Monument

Location
- Location: Algezares, Murcia, Spain
- Interactive map of Sanctuary of Our Lady of Fuensanta
- Coordinates: 37.9615°N 1.0795°W

Architecture
- Type: Sanctuary
- Style: Baroque
- Completed: 1705

The Sanctuary of Our Lady of the Holy Fountain (Spanish: Santuario de Nuestra Señora de la Fuensanta) is a Baroque-style, Roman Catholic church in the pedanía of Algezares, part of the city of Murcia, in the region of Murcia, Spain.

The sanctuary houses the image of Our Lady of Fuensanta, the patron saint of Murcia and its surrounding huerta (fertile plain). The image is a central part in religious processions to Murcia Cathedral in Lent and September.

== Site ==
There is a long history of devotion to Our Lady of Fuensanta in Murcia, originating from an apparition of Mary on the El Hondoyuelo mountain about five kilometers from the City of Murcia, which caused a holy spring (fuente santa) to form. The small spring still flows today. According to tradition, during the Middle Ages, a hermitage was built in a cave and maintained by monks, with records of its existence date back to 1429.

The original hermitage, described in early documents as "between a church and a mosque", by the late 17th century needed to be replaced by a larger church to accommodate the growing number of devotees. Abortive plans to repair the deteriorating hermitage were made in 1624 and 1664.

== History ==
In the late 17th century, a severe drought led many devotees to pray at Fuensanta. The current building began construction in 1694. The facade was completed in 1705 designed by Toribio Martínez de la Vega. The facade had reliefs and sculptures designed by Jaime Bort, and completed by José Balaguer.

In 1925, Rafael Castillo Sáiz restored the towers of the sanctuary. During the Spanish Civil War the interior was destroyed by the Republican forces controlling Murcia, necessitating a complete rebuild in the mid twentieth century. The Diocese of Cartagena own the shrine which has been declared a Cultural Heritage Site (Bien de Interés Cultural).

== Description ==
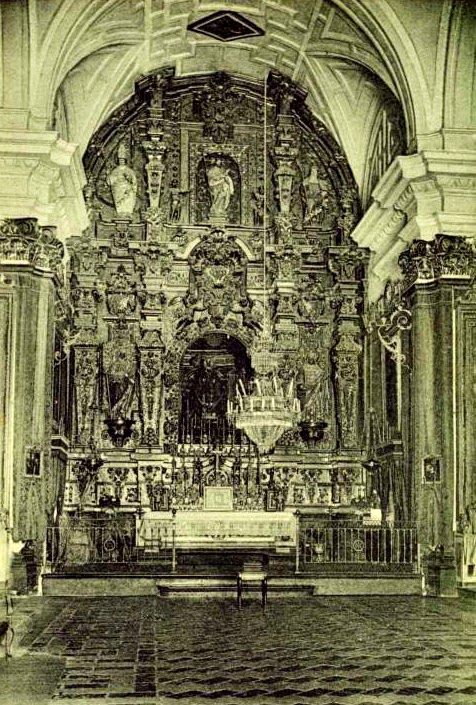
Altar in 1910.

The Baroque sanctuary features a central nave with side chapels and a dome over the crossing. The main facade, designed by Toribio Martínez de la Vega, includes twin towers and a stone portal, above which stand two angels holding the coat of arms of the Murcia Cathedral Chapter. The central niche houses the figure of Our Lady of Fuensanta, sculpted by Jaime Bort, flanked by Saint Fulgentius of Cartagena and Saint Patrick.

Inside, the main altarpiece, created by Antonio Carrión Valverde and Nicolás Prados López, replaces the original Baroque altarpiece, which was destroyed in 1936. The image of Our Lady of Fuensanta, whose author is unknown, is housed in a camarín (small shrine).

The dome and choir feature murals by Pedro Flores García, depicting pilgrimages and the crowning of Our Lady of Fuensanta. Ten sculpted reliefs depicting scenes from the life of the Virgin Mary are located in the side chapels, created by Juan González Moreno.

== Surroundings ==
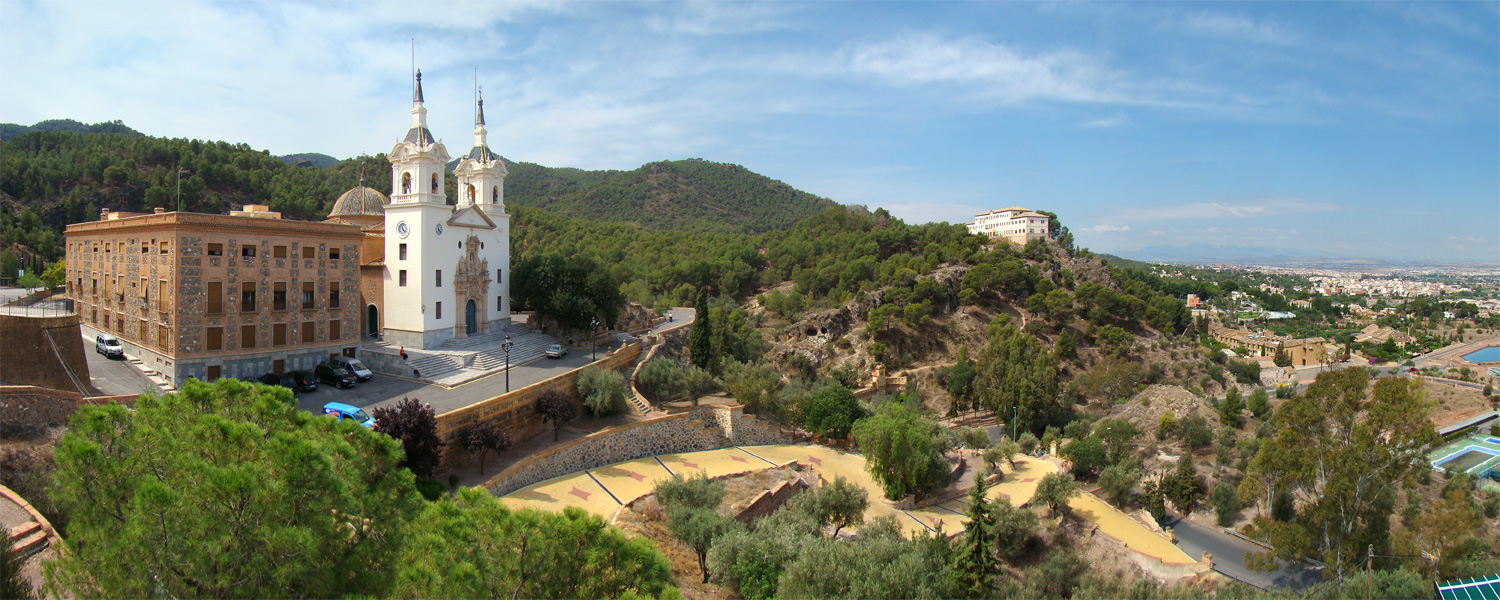
Side view of the sanctuary with the Benedictine monastery in the foreground.

The sanctuary is surrounded by several historical and natural features, including:

- The "Fuente Santa" (Holy Fountain), a Renaissance-style fountain located downhill.
- The House of the Cathedral Chapter, a Neo-Arabic building on a nearby hill.
- The Monastery of Benedictine Nuns which manage the shrine, connected to the shrine by an arched passageway.

The Sanctuary of Fuensanta is situated in the heart of the Cordillera Sur, in the village of Algezares, in a mountainous area that flanks the Segura River Valley to the south. The site offers panoramic views of the Murcian countryside and is located at the edge of the Carrascoy and El Valle Regional Park, a protected natural area.

The sanctuary is one of the most visited in Spain, not only as a place of pilgrimage but also due to its scenic location. From its hilltop location, it offers the best panoramic views of Murcia and the Segura Valley.

== Bibliography ==
- Antón Hurtado, Josefa M. (1996). De la Virgen de la Arrixaca a la Virgen de la Fuensanta [From Our Lady of Arrixaca to Our Lady of Fuensanta] (in Spanish) (1st ed.). Murcia: University of Murcia, Publications Service. ISBN 978-84-7684-687-2.
