= Virgin of Azahar =

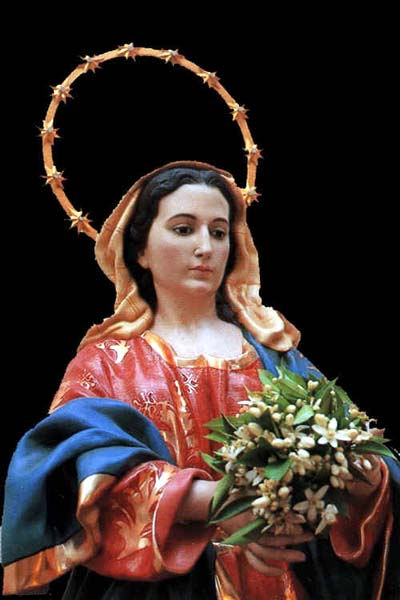
Virgin del Azahar

Virgin of Azahar is one of the invocations of Mary, having her origin in the Spanish city of Beniaján, near Murcia. Beniaján is known worldwide by the abundant production of citrus fruits that its factories export around the world. Citrus is the most important industrial activity in this town.

The statue is a polychrome wooden sculpture carved by Hernández Navarro, and takes its name from the fact that it is holding a natural orange blossom in its hands. The sculpture receives cult in a small hermitage erected in city's outskirts, in a fecund place called Rincón de Villanueva. Her name comes from the natural citrus blossom branch (Azahar in Spanish) which is on the Virgin's hands. Orange citrus and lemon trees are around this small church.

== Festivity ==
The festivity date is 1 May. The sculpture is carried from Beniaján to the hermitage, crossing gardens and fields, in a folk procession.
