= Beniel =

- Municipality
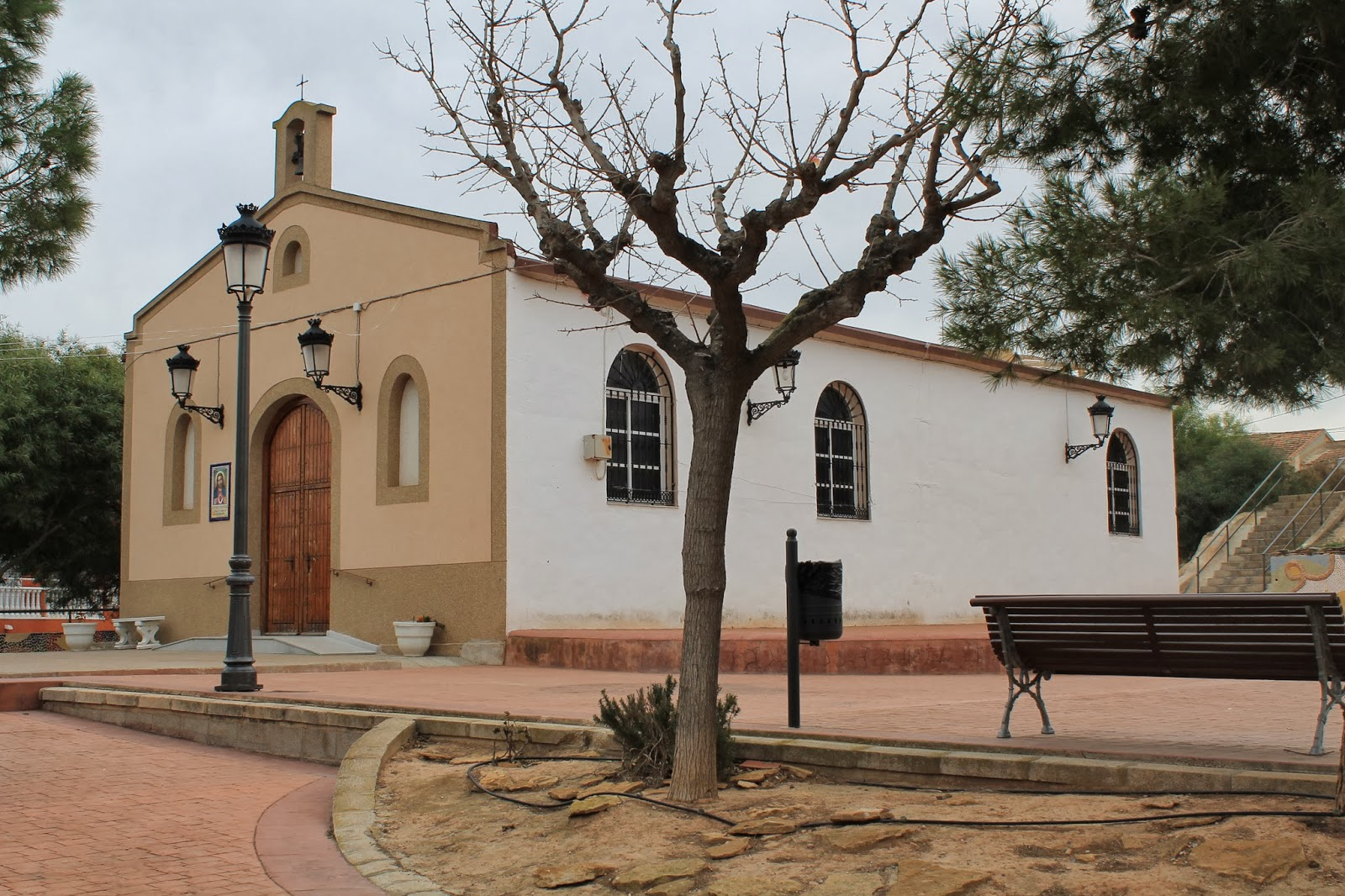

- Flag Coat of arms

- Location in Murcia

- Location in Murcia Location in Spain
- Country: Spain
- Autonomous community: Murcia
- Province: Murcia
- Comarca: Huerta de Murcia

Government
  - Mayor: Roberto García Navarro

Area
  - Total: 10.06 km^{2} (3.88 sq mi)
- Elevation: 29 m (95 ft)

Population (2025-01-01)
  - Total: 11,582
  - Density: 1,151/km^{2} (2,982/sq mi)
- Time zone: UTC+1 (CET)
  - Summer (DST): UTC+2 (CEST)
- Website: Official website

Beniel is a municipality located in the comarca of Huerta de Murcia in Murcia, Spain. It has a total population of 11,501 inhabitants (INE 2023) and an area of 10.06 km^{2}.

== See also ==
- List of municipalities in the Region of Murcia
