= Cresta del Gallo =

Mountain in Spain

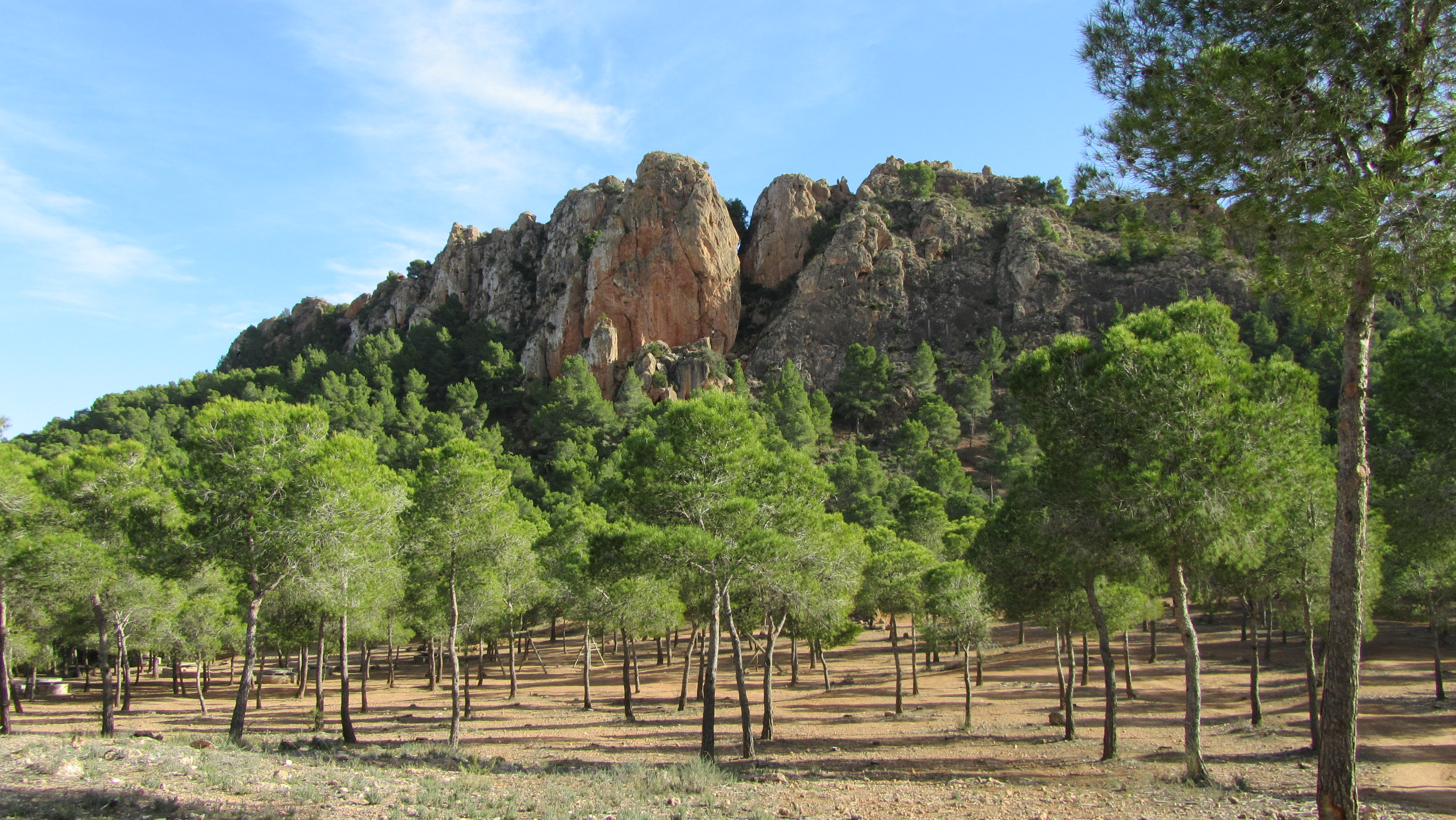
- Peak of Cresta del Gallo, with "La Panocha" in the center

Highest point
- Elevation: 523 m (1,716 ft)
- Coordinates: 37°57′45″N 1°04′10″W

Geography
- Location within Spain
- Location: Garres y Lages, Murcia, Spain
- Parent range: Cordillera Sur (Murcia)

The Cresta del Gallo (Spanish: Cresta del Gallo) is a mountain formation with an altitude of 523 meters, located in the pedanía of Garres y Lages, within the Cordillera Sur (Murcia), and near the city of Murcia, Spain.

The name of the mountain ("Rooster's Crest") comes from the set of large reddish rocks located at its peak, which give it the appearance of a rooster's comb. The largest of these formations is popularly called La Panocha by locals due to its resemblance to an ear of corn. Together with the Sierra de Carrascoy, to which it is a natural extension, it forms part of the Regional Park of Carrascoy and El Valle.

On April 7, 1931, by Royal Order 59/1931, it was declared a natural site of national interest.

== Main Formations ==
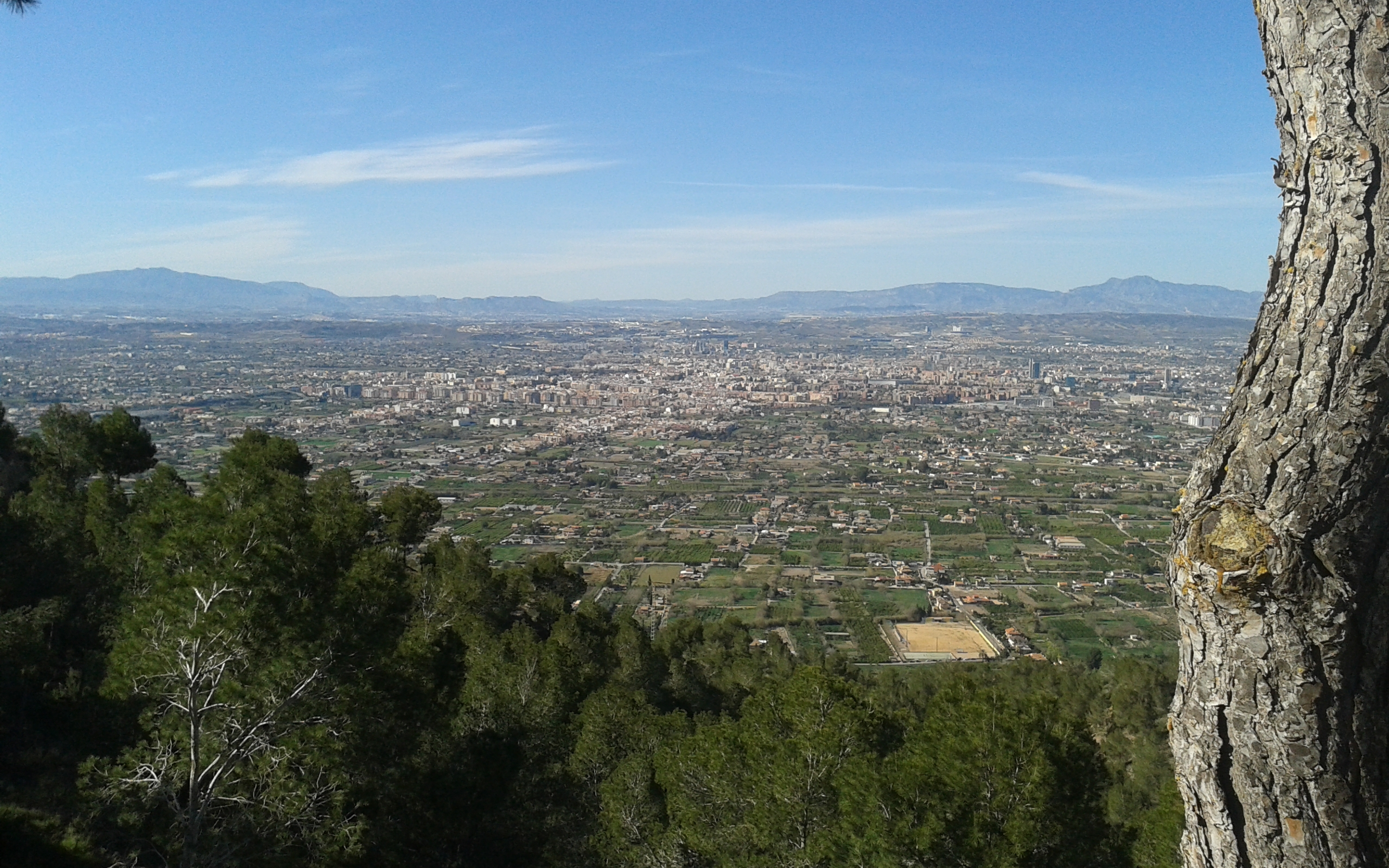
View of Murcia from Cresta del Gallo

La Panocha: A monolith with a maximum height difference of 55 meters on its northern face. It can only be climbed via rock climbing. Its shape, along with its characteristic reddish hue at sunset, which is clearly visible from the city of Murcia, gives it its name. Although it is not the highest point of the Cresta del Gallo (that distinction belongs to El Relojero, at 605 meters), it is undoubtedly the most emblematic rock formation of the entire range.

On clear days, the Mar Menor can be seen from its summit.

== Activities ==
Cresta del Gallo is a popular site for rock climbing and hiking, with an educational climbing school in the area. Several trails begin at the recreational area. Notable sights include the Relojero viewpoint, one of the highest peaks in the region at 605 meters, and the so-called Lunar Landscape.

The recreational area offers picnic facilities and parking, making it an ideal location for family visits.

== Access ==
The mountain can be accessed via three main routes: - A track starting from Beniaján, passing through the former estates of La Tana. - A route from Algezares, following the road leading to the Sanctuary of Our Lady of Fuensanta. - A third path from La Alberca, passing through El Valle and connecting with the road to the Sanctuary of Fuensanta.
