= Los Garres Castle =

Coordinates: 37.9508°N 1.0891°W

Castle of Los Garres
- Castillo de Los Garres (Spanish)
- Interactive map of Castle of Los Garres
- Location: Los Garres, Murcia, Spain

History
- Built: 4th century AD
- Demolished: 7th century AD

Spanish Cultural Heritage
- Type: Monument
- Designated: April 22, 1949

Los Garres Castle (Spanish: Castillo de Los Garres) is a late Roman fortress dating from between the 4th and 7th centuries AD. It is located on the northern slopes of the Cresta del Gallo mountain range, in the area known as Quijal de La Vega, within the Murcian pedanía of Los Garres in Spain.

== History ==
The first known occupation of the hill where the fortress stands dates to the 2nd and 3rd centuries AD, as evidenced by terra sigillata pottery found at the site.

A series of reservoirs were constructed in the second half of the 4th century AD, but later fortifications, particularly the walls of the acropolis, led to the destruction of one reservoir while leaving two others outside the defensive perimeter. The shape of the gateway in the walls, which bears some resemblance to that of Begastri, suggests a construction date in the 6th century AD.

Although the site's importance diminished over time, various archaeological excavations have uncovered objects of Visigothic chronology (though not necessarily of Visigothic manufacture), including a glass necklace bead, fragments of latticework and columns, and two small jugs excavated in 1940. These finds indicate that the site remained occupied until the 7th century AD.

The interpretation of the remains suggests that the site was a Byzantine fortress, possibly part of the defensive system surrounding the Campo de Cartagena due to its proximity to the Garruchal Pass. Alternatively, it may have been linked to late Roman-Visigothic settlements in the foothills, such as the Basilica of Llano del Olivar, which has been associated with the legendary city of Eio.
