= Huerta de Murcia =

- Comarca
- Interactive map of Huerta de Murcia
- Country: Spain
- Autonomous community: Region of Murcia

Area
  - Total: 952 km^{2} (368 sq mi)

Population
  - Total: 529,483

The Huerta de Murcia is an administrative division (comarca) in Murcia, Spain. This natural region encompasses the lands irrigated by the Segura River and its various canals, from the Contraparada weir to the boundary of the Region of Murcia with the Valencian Community. Its principal city is Murcia.

== Municipalities ==
As of 2020, the comarca consists of the following municipalities:

Municipality	Population	Area (km²)	Density (per km²)
Murcia	459,403	881.86	520.95
Alcantarilla	42,345	16.24	2607.45
Santomera	16,270	44.2	368.10
Beniel	11,465	10	1146.5

== Geography ==
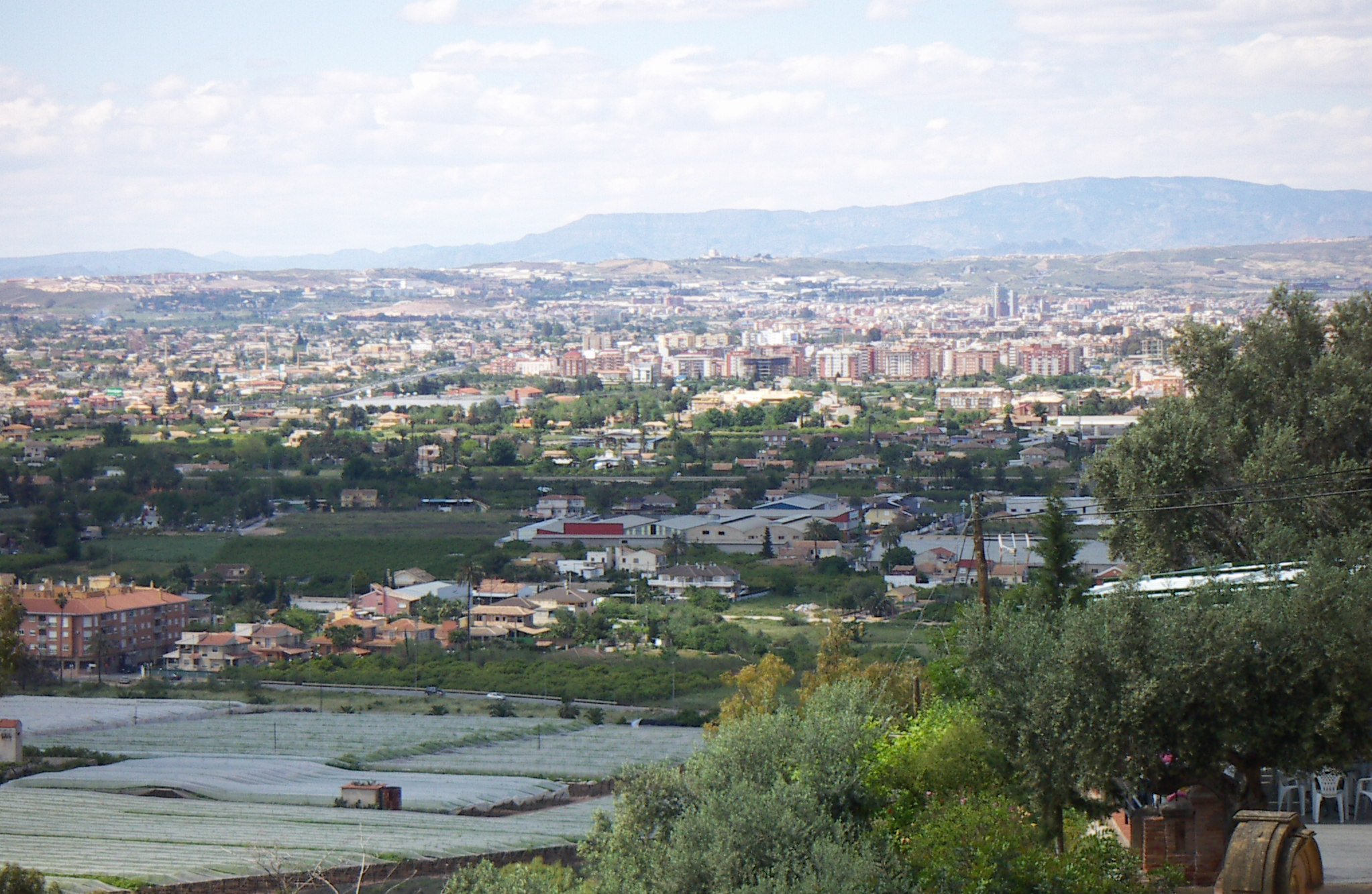
The Segura River valley from the Cordillera Sur, with Murcia city in the background.

The natural comarca of Huerta de Murcia is flanked to the north and south by two mountain ranges that border the Segura River's floodplain and its tributary, the Guadalentín, locally known as El Reguerón.

The comarca extends across the entire municipalities of Alcantarilla, Santomera, and Beniel, as well as most of Murcia. Several outlying districts of Murcia belong to the Campo de Murcia rather than the Huerta.

== Administrative Division ==
The division of the Region of Murcia into comarcas was anticipated in the Statute of Autonomy of the Region of Murcia (1982), but no official comarca subdivision has been legally established yet.

The most commonly proposed administrative comarca includes the entirety of Alcantarilla, Murcia, Santomera, and Beniel.

== Subcomarcas ==
The territory of Huerta de Murcia is further subdivided into seven sub-comarcas:

- La Huerta-Margen Izquierda
- La Huerta-Margen Derecha
- Costera Norte
- Cordillera Sur
- Campo de Sangonera
- Campo de Carrascoy
- The City

== Demographic Evolution ==
Population of Huerta de Murcia (2008)
Municipality	Population	Area (km²)	Density (per km²)
Alcantarilla	41,084	16.24	2529.8
Beniel	10,933	10.06	1093.3
Murcia	436,870	881.86	495.4
Santomera	15,319	44.2	346.58
Total	504,206	952.36	529.42

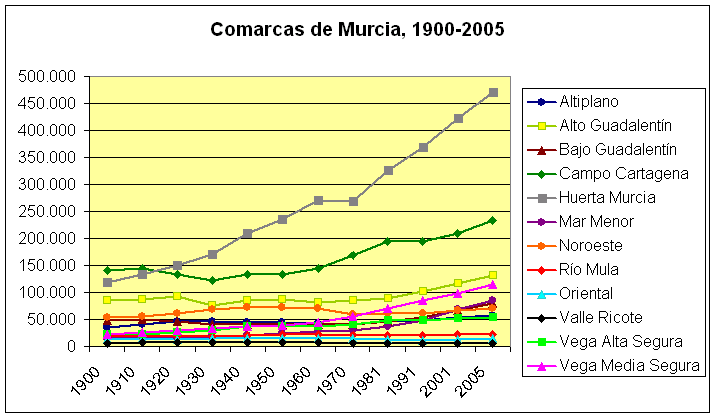
Demographic evolution of Huerta de Murcia (gray line) compared to other comarcas in the region.

== History ==
The fertile valley of the Huerta de Murcia was formed by the sediments of the Quaternary era, deposited by the Segura River and the Guadalentín.

Although the Romans cultivated in the Huerta, the most significant development came with the Muslims, who drained marshlands and built an efficient irrigation system based on the Contraparada.

Following the Christian conquest of Murcia (1265-1266), much of the land was abandoned as many Muslims fled. Later, settlers arrived mainly from the Crown of Aragon (72%) and Crown of Castile (23%), with others from Navarre, France, Italy, and Portugal.

== Irrigation Network ==
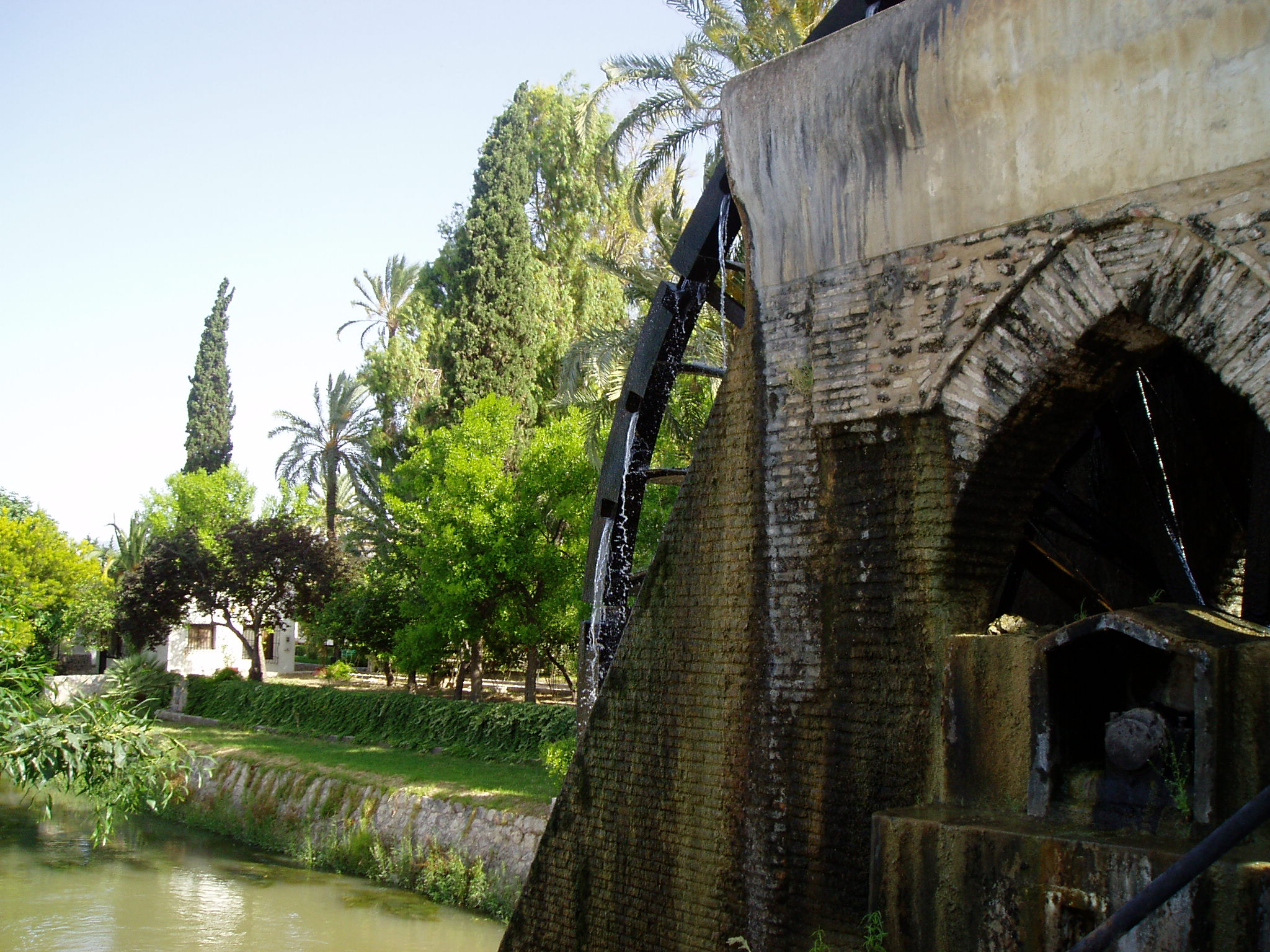
Rueda de Alcantarilla with the Ethnological Museum in the background.

The irrigation network of the Huerta de Murcia dates back to the Muslim era and is among the oldest in Spain. Key features include:

- The Contraparada, an ancient weir on the Segura River
- Two main canals: Acequia Mayor Alquibla (South) and Acequia Mayor Aljufía (North)
- Various secondary channels including brazales, landronas, and azarbes
- Traditional water wheels, or norias, used to lift water to higher fields
