= Beniaján =

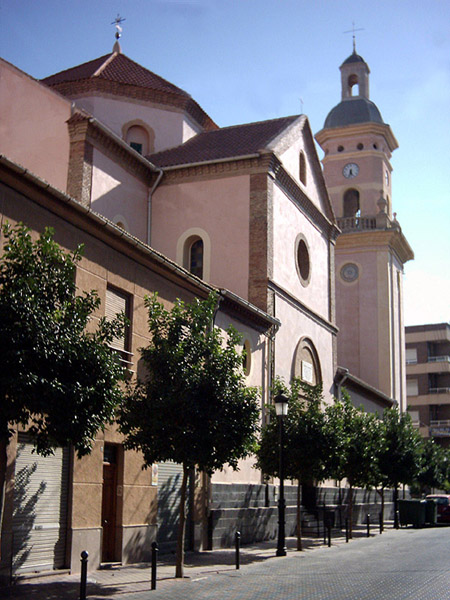

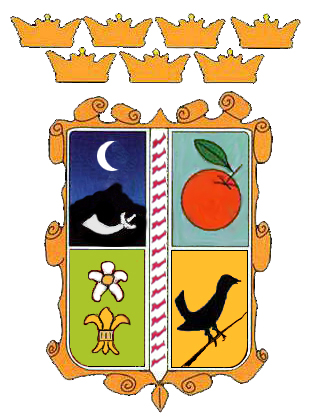
- Seal

- Location in Spain
- Coordinates: 37°59′N 1°04′W
- Country: Spain
- Autonomous community: Region of Murcia
- Province: Murcia
- Comarca: Huerta de Murcia

Government
  - Mayor: Francisco Hernández Quereda

Area
  - Total: 13.924 km^{2} (5.376 sq mi)

Population (2010)
  - Total: 11,233
  - Density: 806.74/km^{2} (2,089.4/sq mi)
- Demonym: Beniajanenses
- Time zone: UTC+1 (CET)
  - Summer (DST): UTC+2 (CEST)
- Website: Official website

Beniaján is a village located in the Region of Murcia (Spain), beside the mountains that close the Valley of Segura. It has a population of around 11,000, and is not far from the region's capital, Murcia.

Beniaján is known for the abundant production of citrus fruits that its factories export around the world; this is the most important economic activity in this city.

The town was founded during Roman times. Since before the 18th century, the Virgen del Carmen has been the Patrona (patron saint) of Beniaján. A statue is carried in procession annually in celebration of her feast day.

== Main sights ==
- San Juan Bautista's church and Patrona's Chapel (17th-20th centuries)
- Villanueva's church, Virgin of Azahar
- Mirador de San Antón (viewing point)
- Puntarrón Chico, a rocky spur commanding the city, home to an Argaric archaeological site
- Parque Regional de El Valle y Carrascoy (mountains and natural spaces with special protection)

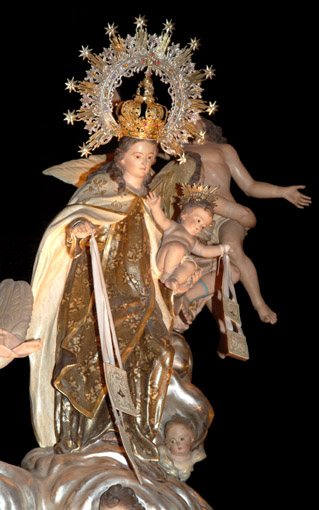
Our Lady of Mount Carmel, 18th-century statue

== Festivals ==
These are the main festivities of the town:

- San Antón, 17 January
- Carnival
- Easter
- Virgin of Azahar, 1 May
- Virgen del Carmen, Patrona (patron saint) of Beniaján, 16 July

== See also ==
- El Argar
