= Murcia Cathedral =

Catholic church in Murcia, Spain

Cathedral Church of Saint Mary
- Santa Iglesia Catedral de Santa María
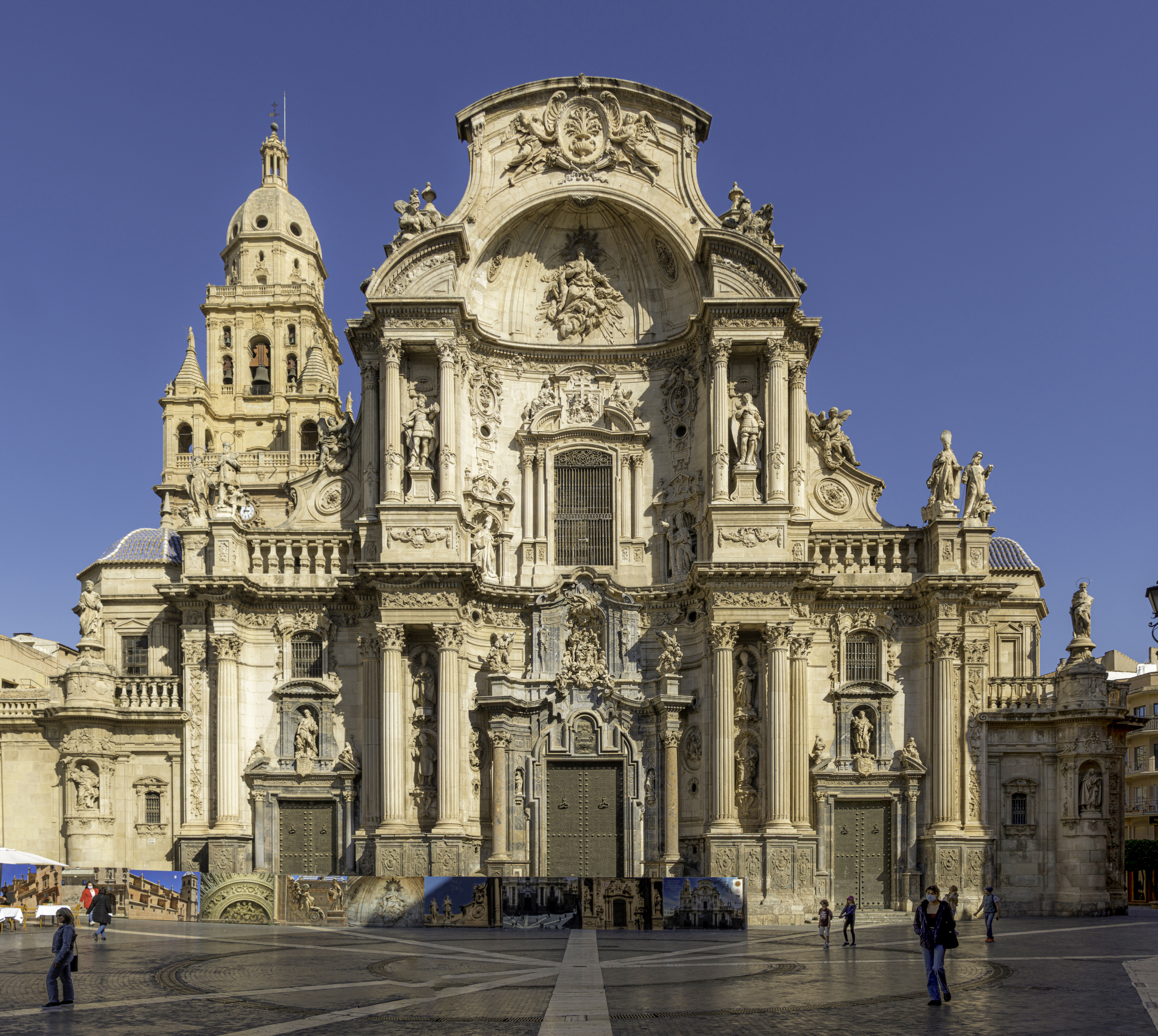
- Cathedral Church of Saint Mary of the Diocese of Cartagena in Murcia

Religion
- Affiliation: Roman Catholic Church
- Province: Diocese of Cartagena
- Ecclesiastical or organizational status: Cathedral

Location
- Location: Murcia, Spain
- Interactive map of Cathedral Church of Saint Mary
- Coordinates: 37.9838°N 1.1283°W

Architecture
- Type: Church
- Style: Gothic, Renaissance, Baroque
- Groundbreaking: 1394
- Completed: 1465

The Cathedral Church of Saint Mary in Murcia (Spanish: Iglesia Catedral de Santa María en Murcia), commonly called the Cathedral of Murcia, is a Catholic church in the city of Murcia, Spain. It is the cathedral of the Roman Catholic Diocese of Cartagena.

== History ==
The Christian king Jaime I the Conqueror conquered the city during the Mudéjar revolt of 1264–66. Jaime I took the Great Mosque or Aljamía to consecrate it to the Virgin Mary; a custom he put in place when he conquered any settlement. However, it was not until the 14th century that construction of the cathedral would begin. In 1385 work on the foundations started and in 1388 the first stone was laid. Another six years passed until constructions upwards continued; the cathedral would be finished in October 1467. Nevertheless, the cathedral continued to evolve until the 18th century, demonstrating a variety of artistic styles.

The interior is largely Gothic in style; the facade is Baroque and it was designed by the Valencian architect and sculptor Jaume Bort i Meliá.

The heart and the entrails of King Alfonso X the Wise are buried under the main altar of the cathedral, as he indicated in his testament, as a gift and proof of his love to Murcia and in thanks to the fidelity that the city showed to him.

In 1854 the cathedral suffered a terrible fire that destroyed the high altar and the choir stalls. The repair works consisted in the creation of a new neo-Gothic altarpiece (work of the sculptors Pescador and Palao), and the commission of a majestic organ, undertaken by the Belgian firm Merklin-Schütze. Under the organ 16th-century plateresque chairs from the Monastery of Santa Maria de Valdeiglesias were installed, a donation made by Queen Isabel II to the cathedral.

== Bell tower ==
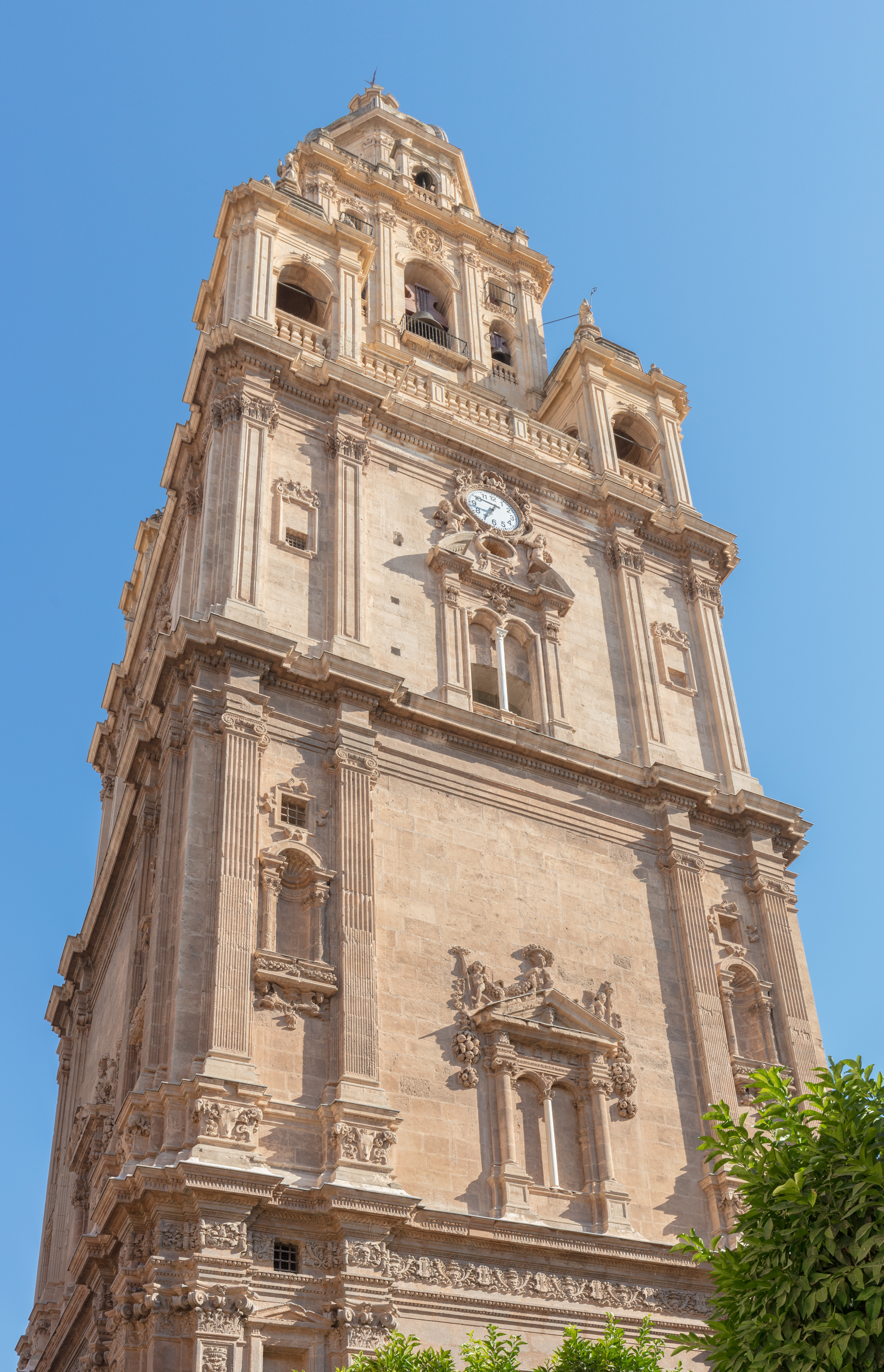
Bell tower

The bell tower, built between 1521 and 1791, stands 90 metres (300 ft) tall—95 metres (312 ft) with the weathervane. It is the tallest campanile in Spain. It ascends in five levels of different widths. The tower also combines a variety of styles.

- The first level, made by Francisco Florentino and Jacobo Torni, has a square plant with Renaissance style and ornamentation influenced by the Hispanic Plateresque.
- The second body, made by Jerónimo Quijano, has the same style but it is more purist.
- The third floor, with Baroque style, has the body with Rococó style and the cupola, drawn up by Ventura Rodríguez, with Neoclassic style.
- In the fourth floor, there are four conjuratories. Located in each corner, special ceremonies were conducted in them by priests to ward off storms by means of the Lignum Crucis.

== Bells ==
There are twenty-five bells, all from the 17th century and the 18th century. Each has its own name. Among them are:

- The Bell of the Spells
- La Catalana
- The Bell of Prayer
- La Fuensanta
- The Conception
- La Segundilla
- The greater or Agueda-Martillo, which is the main bell

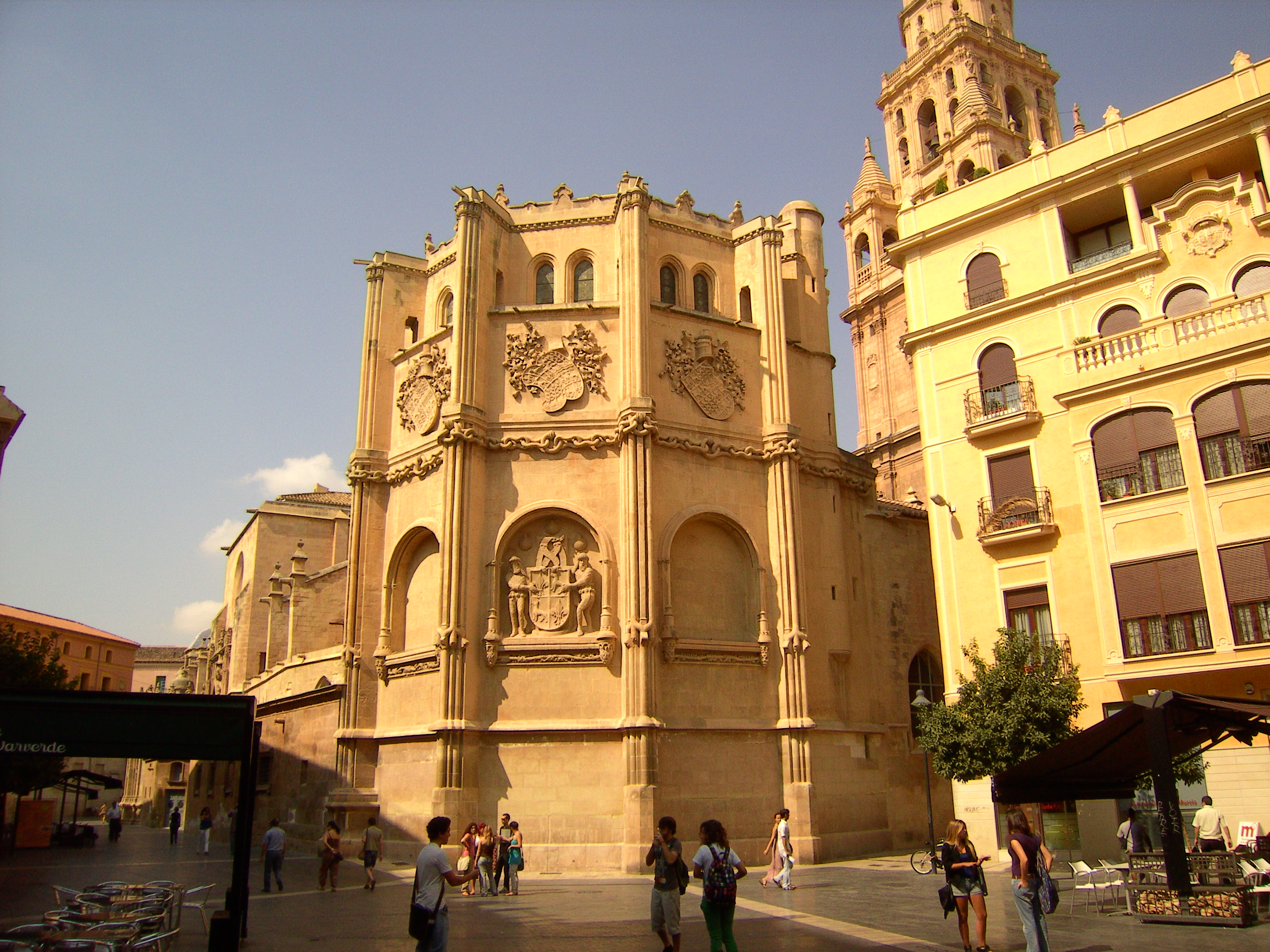
Chapel of los Vélez

The bells have served to warn the population about the catastrophic floods of the Segura River, wars, celebrations, and festivities. The oldest bell (14th century), la Campana Mora (the moor bell), is kept in the Museum of the Cathedral of Murcia.

== Interior ==
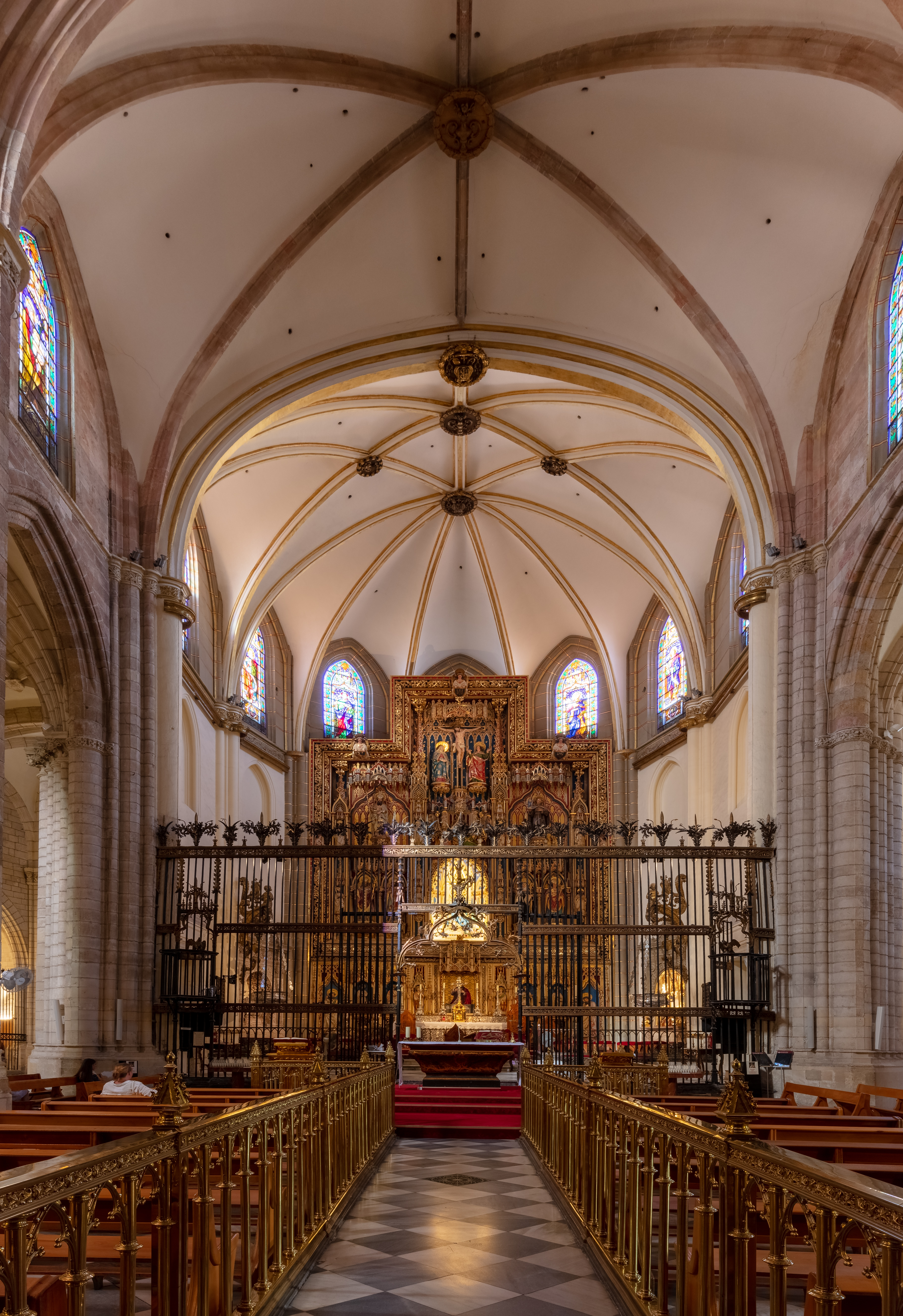
Main altar

The interior is mainly Gothic. It is made up of three naves with an apse and twenty-three chapels. The chapels are dedicated to the patron saints of the labour unions and to the burials of the bishops and nobles that helped or collaborated with the construction of the cathedral. Some of the chapels include:

- The Chapel of the Apse or the Vélez Chapel: it has Flaming Gothic style, with a cupola of stars with ten points.
- The Chapel of Junterones: it is one of the great works of the Spanish Renaissance.
- The Chapel of the Immaculate: it is Baroque in style.

The Plateresque chairs of the choir, post-choir, and the portal of the sacristy, are also of note.

== Exterior ==
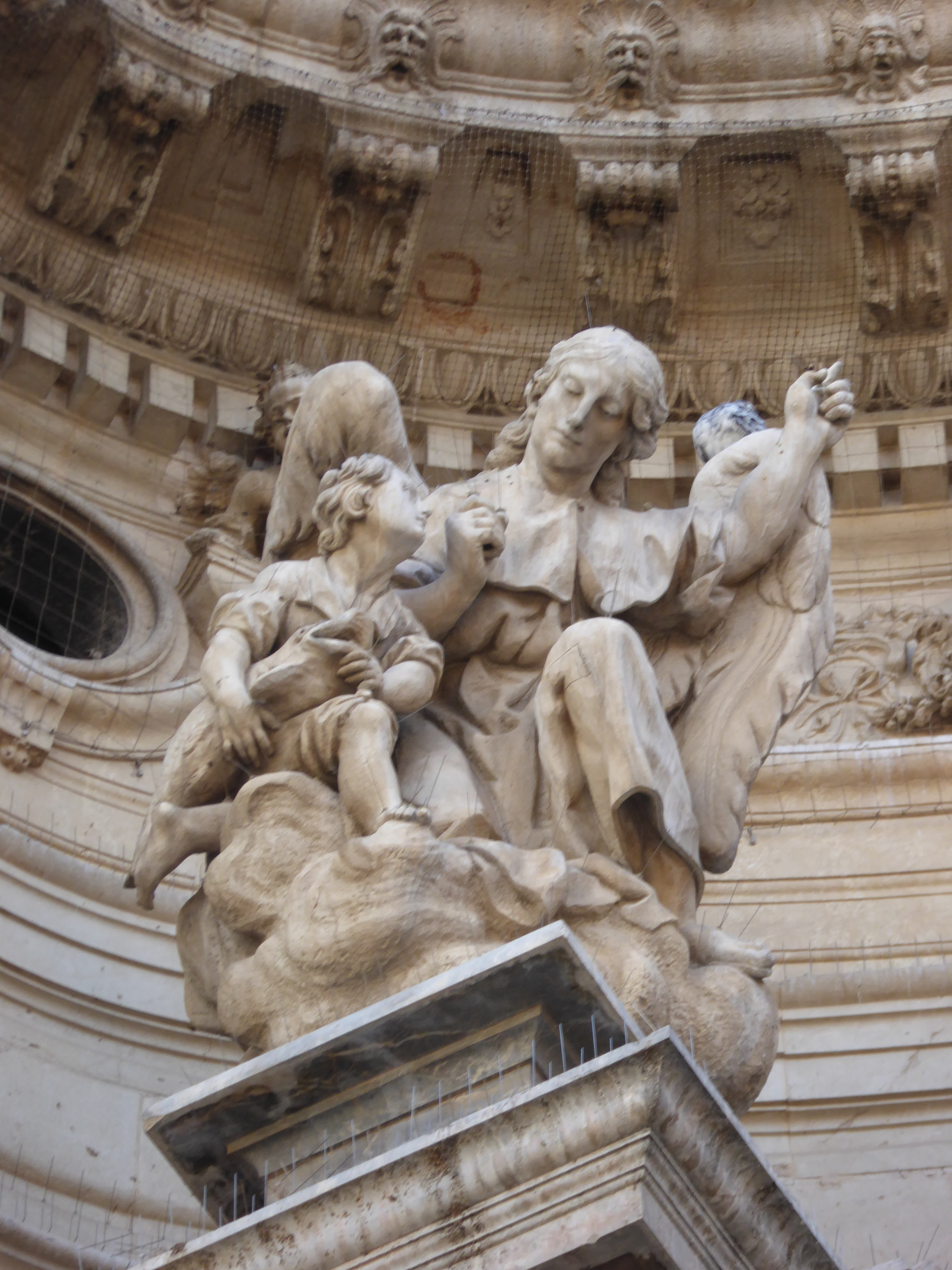
Facade detail

- Door of the Apostoles: Constructed in 1488 by Diego Sánchez de Almazán. It has Gothic style. At the jambs (sides) of the door, the sculptures of the four apostles are shown. It also has a shield which honors the queen Isabel the Catholic.
- Chapel of the Marquess of Vélez: Its plan is polygonal and adorned with the shields of the Chacones and the Fajardos.
- Door of the Chains: Made of two bodies (the inferior from the 16th century and the superior from the 18th century), with reliefs of the brothers San Leandro, San Isidoro, and San Fulgencio.
- Main Facade: It has Baroque style. The main facade has an exceptional beauty and it is unique. It was built under the initiative of the Cabildo, with the help of Cardinal Belluga, and it was made by Jaime Bort.
- Exaltation of the Virgin Mary

== See also ==
- 16th-century Western domes
