= Algezares =

Coordinates: 38.1512°N 1.7458°W

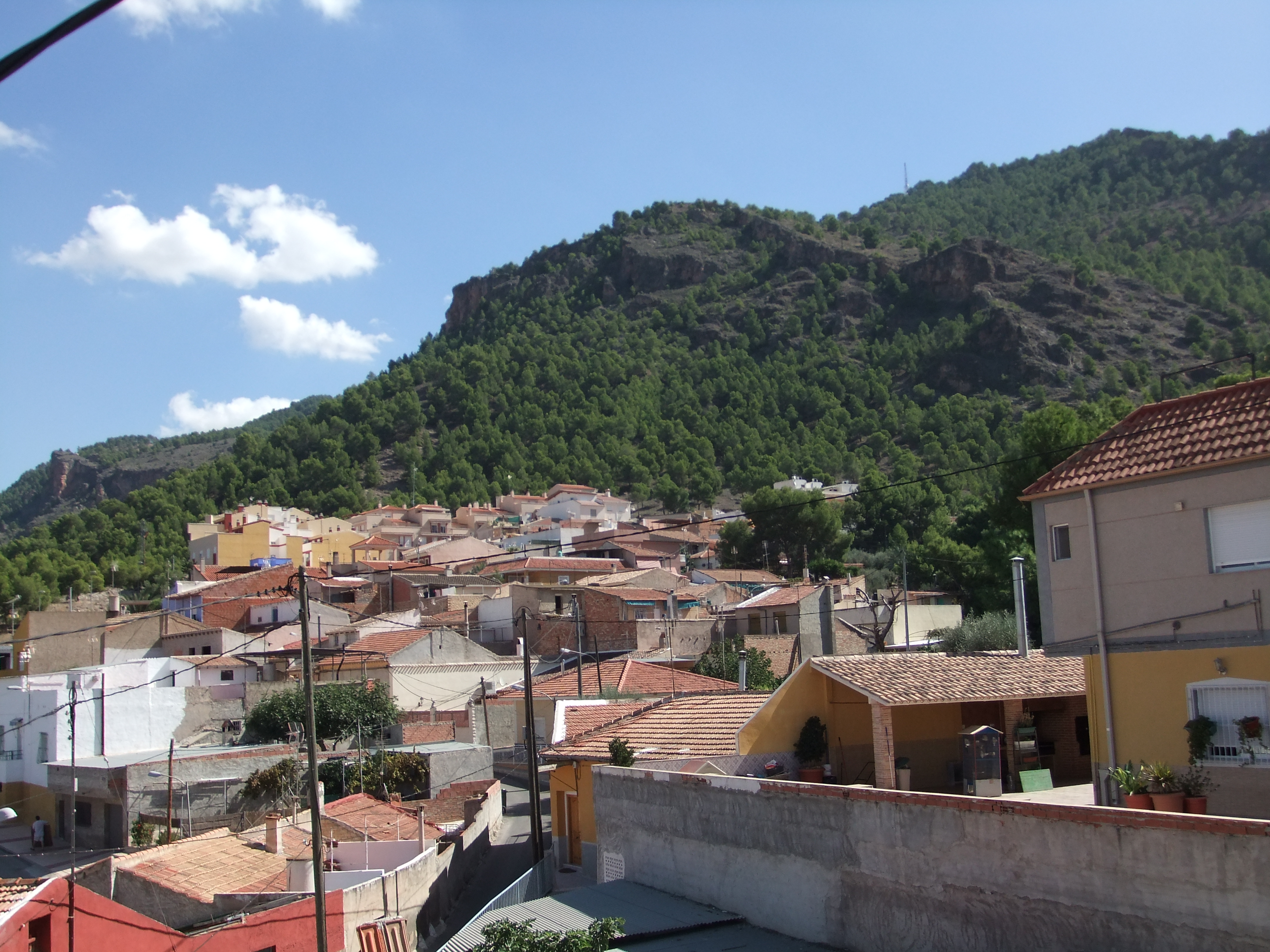
- Interactive map of Algezares
- Country: Spain
- Province: Murcia
- Municipality: Murcia

Population (2015)
  - Total: 5,451

Algezares is a village and a district in Murcia, Spain. It is part of the municipality of Murcia and is almost located in the centre. It has an area of 24.74 km^{2}, and had a population of 5,620 in 2020.

It is the site of the Sanctuary of Our Lady of Fuensanta.

== Demographics ==
8.896% inhabitants are foreigners – 3.91% come from other country of Europe, 2.24% are Africans, 2.49% are Americans and 0.249% are Asians. The table below shows the population trends of the district in the 21st by its five-year periods.

	2001	2006	2011	2016
Population	4473	4814	5283	5481
