= Comarcas of the Region of Murcia =

The demarcation of the comarcas of the Murcia region has been the subject of debate. According to La Verdad newspaper, there are three main divisions.

== Altiplano ==
Atiplano is located in the north and is 1,580 km^{2} in the area. It includes the municipalities of Yecla and Jumilla. Regarding, what are present mainly in the area are mountain ranges such as Sierra del Carche, Sierra del Buey, Sierra Larga and Sierra del Molar. No rivers traverse the region, but several ramblas (dry stream beds but in rainy periods) occur in the comarca.

== Alto Guadalentín or Comarca de Lorca ==
This territory is located in the southeast and has an area of 2,071.8 km^{2}. The municipalities of Lorca, Águilas, and Puerto Lumbreras belong to this comarca. There is a remarkable water landform in the area: Guadalentín River. Another river that is present is the Luchena River. Other noteworthy landforms that occupy Alto Guadalentín are the mountain ranges Sierra de la Almenara, Sierra de la Carrasquilla, Sierra de Cantar, Sierra de la Torrecilla, Sierra de En medio, and Sierra del Cambrón.

== Noroeste ==
This comarca is located in the northwest of Region of Murcia, hence its name, which meaning is “northwest.” The municipalities of Moratalla, Caravaca de la Cruz, and Cehegín are agreed to be included in this area in all the proposals. However, the municipalities of Calasparra and Bullas only belong to the comarca under a more limited definition. If all five municipalities were included, the territory has an area of 2,386.9 km^{2}. However, if the smaller definition is taken as true, the comarca is 2,119.2 km^{2} in the area. Some remarkable landforms in the region are a mountain range named Sierra de Moratalla that occupies part of the north of Noroeste; a mountain range named Sierra de la Muela, which is also placed in the north; Revolcadores, which is a mountainous area that occurs in the east of Noroeste and a river which name is Quípar that is present in the western half of the comarca.

== Cuenca de Mula ==
It includes the municipalities of Mula, Pliego, Albudeite, and Campos del Río. According to the University of Murcia proposal, Bullas would also belong to this comarca. In this region, there are two rivers. Part of the mountain ranges are also present in the area – the north of Sierra Espuaña occupies little part of the south of Cuenca de Mula and the east of Sierra de Cambrón occupies a little part of the southeast of this comarca.

== More varying comarcas ==
=== Bajo Guadalentín ===
Its largest version includes five municipalities: Aledo, Lorca, Alhama de Murcia, Librilla, and Mazarrón and has an area of 1,024.7 km2. If a smaller version is adopted, the only municipality that doesn't belong to this territory is Mazarrón and has an extension of 706 km^{2}. A significant landform of the comarca is the Guadalentín river – a stretch of it traverses the territory, hence its name. Part of Sierra Espuña, one of the most important mountain ranges in the Region of Murcia, is located in the northwest of Bajo Guadalentín. Suppose Mazarrón is considered a part of the region. In that case, Sierra de las Moreras and Sierra del Algarrobo mountain ranges will also occur in the Bajo Guadalentín as well as Rambla de Las Moreras.

=== Campo de Cartagena ===
This territory is located in the southeast of the province of Murcia. Regarding mountain reliefs, some of them are Sierra Minera Cartagena- La Unión, Sierra de la Muela. There are no water basins with a permanent water flow, but there are several arroyos (creeks) or ramblas; the most important are Rambla del Albujón and Rambla de Benipila.

Mar Menor might also be considered a comarca, although some say it is part of Campo de Cartagena . This includes Torre-Pacheco, San Pedro del Pinatar, San Javier, and Los Alcázares municipalities. An important mountain relief that occurs in this region is Cabezo Gordo.

=== Área Metropolitana de Murcia ===
The municipalities that are part of this comarca are the ones that the most change the comarca they belong to according to the demarcation initiative.

The municipalities of Huerta de Murcia, which is considered as another comarca according to two initiatives, are part of Área Metropolitana de Murcia. These municipalities are Murcia, Alcantarilla, Santomera and Beniel. Mountain landforms that take place in the region are Cresta del Gallo, Sierra de los Villares (mountain range), Columbares and the eastern area of Sierra de Carrascoy. Two rivers traverse Huerta de Murcia: Segura and Guadalentín.

Most municipalities of Vega Media (but Lorquí) are part of Área Metropolitana de Murcia and these are Molina de Segura, Ceutí, Alguazas and Torres de Cotillas.

=== Comarca Oriental ===
Atlas Global de la Región de Murcia considers that a northern-eastern comarca that includes the municipalities of Abanilla and Fortuna exists. The reasons for the statement of this comarca are topographical and geohydrographical. It covers an area of 385.1 km^{2}.

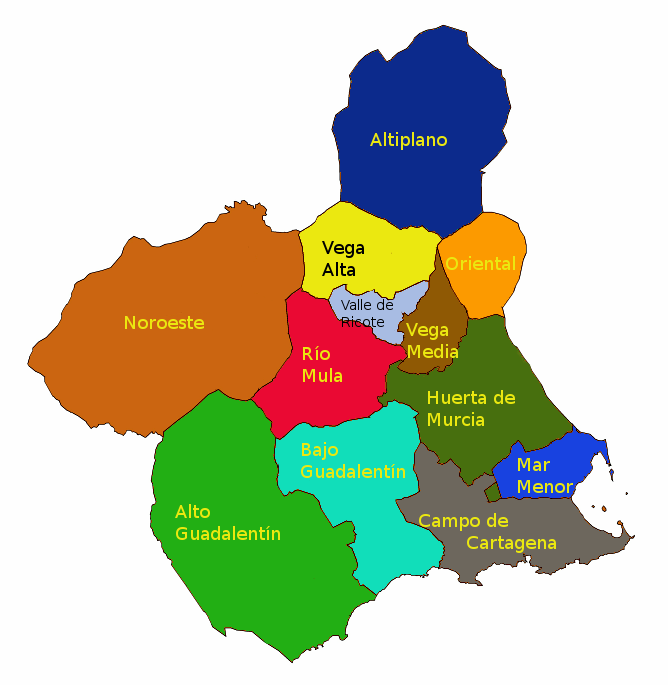
The comarcas of Region of Murcia according to Consejo Regional de Murcia

In regards to landforms, there are seven mountain ranges and a river in this territory. Some of the spots are a mountain range called Sierra de La Pila, which eastern area occupies the northwest of the comarca; another mountain range named Sierra de Quibas, which occurs in the northeast of the region; Sierra del Corque; and Sierra de Abanilla, that is placed in the southeastern quarter. The river is called Río Chícamo and traverses the southeast of the comarca.

== Comarca demarcation proposals ==
- According to University of Murcia (1968): Altiplano of Yecla and Jumilla; Campo de Lorca, the name in this proposal of Altiplano; Cuenca de Mula, which includes an additional municipality that it part of Noroeste in most proposals, Bullas; Vega Alta del Segura; Vega Media del Segura (Huerta de Murcia and Comarca Oriental); Campo de Lorca; Bajo Guadalentín and Campo de Cartagena.
- According to Ministerio de agricultura (1977): Nordeste (Altiplano), Noroeste, Centro (Cuenca de Mula), Río Segura, Suroeste y Valle de Guadalentín (the more usual comarcas Alto Guadalentín and Bajo Guadalentín) and Campo de Cartagena.
- According to Subsecretaría de Planificación, Ministerio del Interior (1977): Jumilla - Yecla (whose usual name is Altiplano), Caravaca (that is corresponding to the smallest version of Nororeste), Alto Segura, Mula, Centro metropolitano de Murcia, Campo de Lorca, Valle del Guadalentín (Bajo) and Campo de Cartagena.
- According to Consejo Regional de Murcia (1980): Altiplano, Noroeste, Vega Alta, Valle de Ricote, Vega Media, Comarca Oriental, Río Mula, Huerta de Murcia, Alto Guadalentín, Bajo Guadalentín, Campo de Cartagena and Mar Menor.
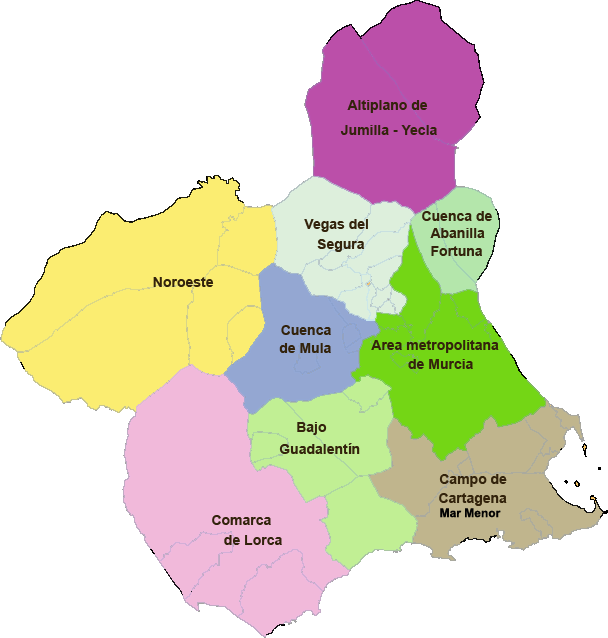
  Comarcas demarcation according to Atlas Global de la Región de Murcia
- According to González Ortiz y Sánchez (1981): Altiplano, Noroeste in its largest version, Vega Alta, Cuenca de Mula in its smallest version, Vega Media (Huerta de Murcia and Comarca Oriental), Campo de Lorca, Bajo Guadalentín and Campo de Cartagena.
- According to Zorita y Calvo (1984): Altiplano, Noroeste, Vega Alta, Valle de Ricote, Vega Media, Comarca Oriental, Río Mula, Huerta de Murcia, Alto Guadalentín, Bajo Guadalentín, Campo de Cartagena and Mar Menor.
- According to the Atlas of Region of Murcia of La Verdad newspapers: Altiplano, Noroeste, Vegas del Segura, Cuenca de Mula, Cuenca de Abanilla-Fortuna, Comarca de Lorca, Bajo Guadalentín and Campo de Cartagena.
