= Mula, Spain =

Mula
- Municipality
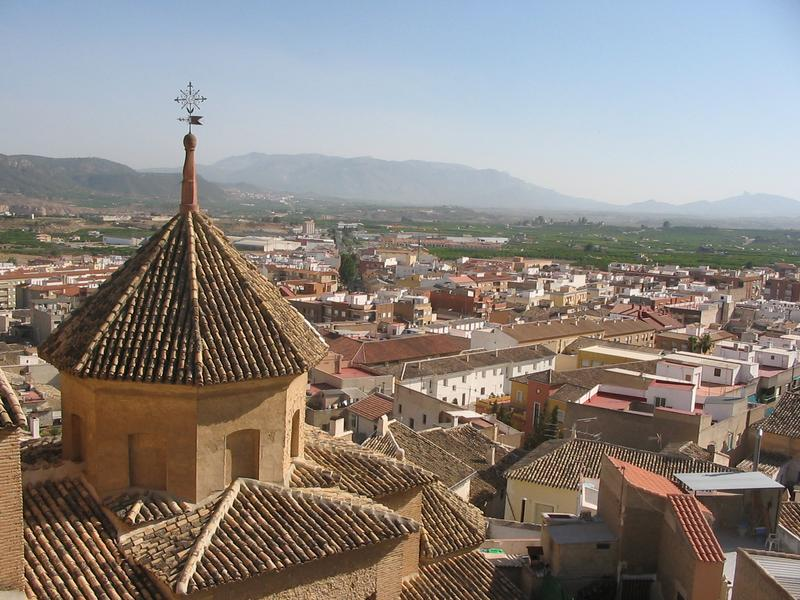

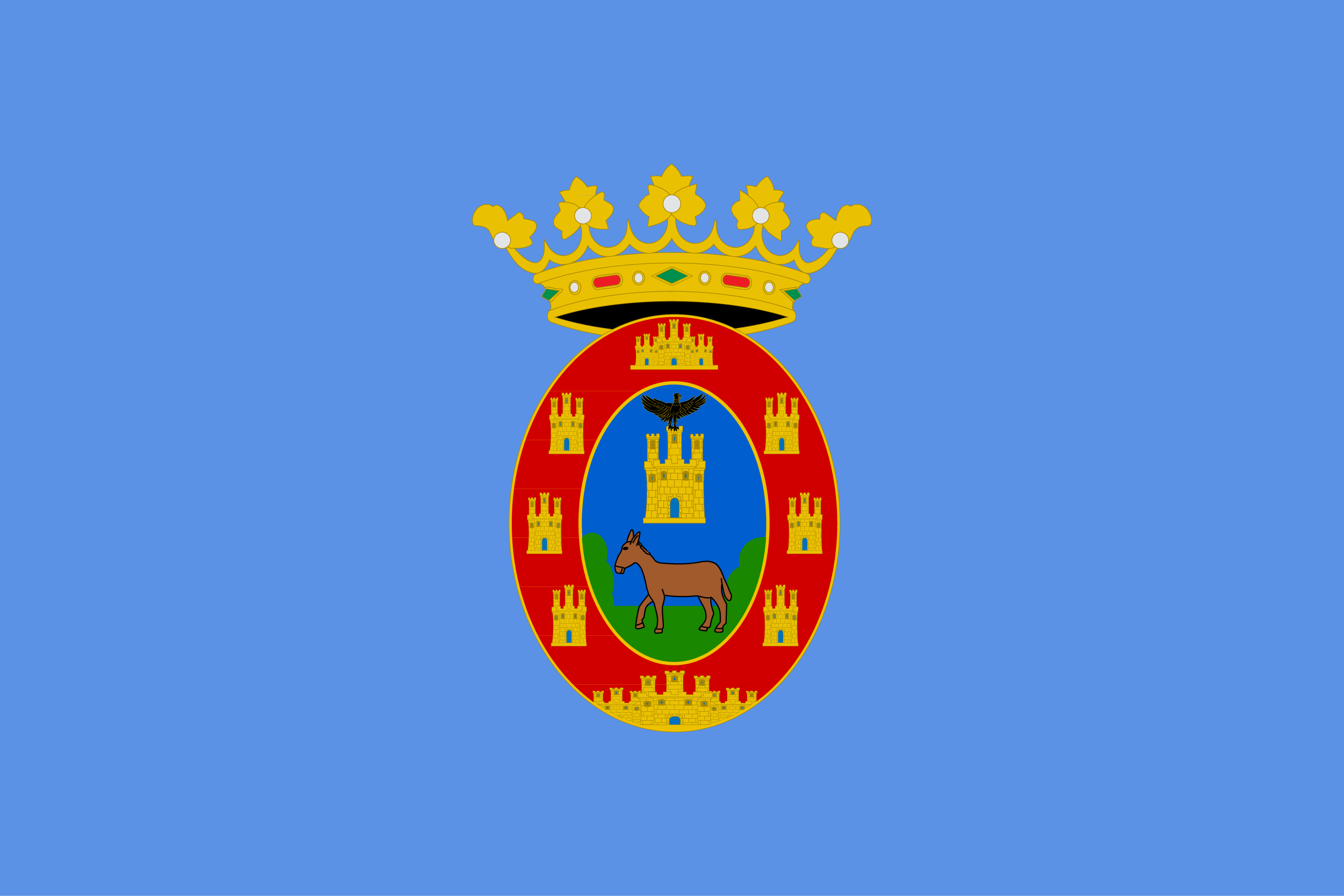
- Flag Coat of arms

- Location in Spain Location in Murcia
- Country: Spain
- Autonomous community: Region of Murcia
- Founded: 713 (documented)

Government
  - Mayor: José Iborra (2011) (PPRM-PP)

Area
  - Total: 633.38 km^{2} (244.55 sq mi)
- Elevation: 313 m (1,027 ft)
- Highest elevation: 1,525 m (5,003 ft)

Population (2025-01-01)
  - Total: 17,937
  - Density: 28.319/km^{2} (73.347/sq mi)
- Demonym: Muleños
- Time zone: UTC+1 (CET)
  - Summer (DST): UTC+2 (CEST)
- Postal code: 30170
- Website: Official website

Mula is a municipality of Spain belonging to the Region of Murcia. It is located in southeastern Iberia. It has a total area of 633.84 km^{2} and, as of 1 January 2020, a registered population of 17,021.

It is best known for the tamboradas (drumming processions) held during the Holy Week.

== Geography ==
Map showing the extension of the municipality of Mula in the Region of Murcia

The neighborhoods of Mula include Fuente Librilla, Yechar, Los Baños De Mula, Puebla De Mula, and Casas Nuevas.

The municipality of Mula has the following neighboring municipalities:

- Calasparra, Cieza and Ricote to the North
- Ricote, Campos del Río, Albudeite, Alcantarilla and Murcia to the East
- Librilla, Alhama de Murcia and Totana to the South
- Bullas, Cehegín and Lorca to the West
- Pliego is completely surrounded by Mula.

Part of Sierra Espuña mountain range occupies part of the municipality. Another remarkable geographical element is Mula river and a stretch of it traverses Mula. There are also some arroyos (creeks) or ramblas.

== History ==
There is evidence of human occupancy from the Prehistory, specifically the Neolithic. During the Calcolithic this municipality was also occupied by people of the Argaric civilization.

The people that lived in the territory during the Bronze Age have left a remarkable site: El Cigarralejo, which was an Iberian settlement and included a necropolis and a shrine.

During the Roman Hispania era there was also people presence in the current municipality. Remains of that presence are some archaeological sites. One of them is a former villa named Villaricos. There were people in a former town that is currently an archaeological site named Cerro de la Almagra.

In Muslim Iberian Peninsula era there were people living in Mula and they established a town at the same place as the current town.

Following the 1243 Treaty of Alcaraz, a Castilian army led by the then infante Alfonso of Castile laid siege and took the place by force in 1244. Located on the slopes of a hill, the place was well fortified, with a double rim of walls. Water supply was secured by the seizure of the network of aljibes located to the northeast. Most of the Muslim population was driven out of the place and Mula, following the ensuing demographic replacement, henceforth became a vanguard post and power base of the Crown of Castile in the region. Taking the former into account, the town presumably remained in possession of Castile during the 1264–66 Mudéjar revolt. The Muslim population relocated to the hamlet of La Puebla de Mula.

A royal demesne town nestled in between the dominions of the military orders of Santiago, the Temple and the Hospital, as well as the Nasrid Kingdom of Granada, Mula was granted several privileges in 1296, including tax exemptions and the ratification of its fuero. In the wake of the Aragonese occupation of the Kingdom of Murcia, favoured by the substantial number of Aragonese settlers in the realm, the town of Mula rose in rebellion against the Crown of Aragon in favour of the Castilian monarch in 1298.

Mula experienced a demographic boom following the Fall of Granada, increasing its population threefold in barely three decades.

During the 17th century Mula was scenery of epidemics and starvation. The plague of 1648 cost the lives of half of the people.

In the early 19th century people experienced a poverty situation. The lack of clearness, the lack of harvests, the war and two strong epidemics caused population losses. In Peninsular War context, French people invaded and plundered Mula in October 1812.

In the early 20th century, two urban structures and services were set: the railroad and a reservoir. The traditional wine and olive tree cultivation was ceased, and citrus began to be raised. This led to a need of more water and to the reservoir construction.

A population rise occurred until the 1960s; the number of inhabitants consisted of 15,000 in that year. With increasing population the town was expanded to the south.

After this increase, the town became stabilized because there are few wealth sources: agriculture and water supplies. Therefore, the number of inhabitants depended on the level of this economic activity and of that resource.

== Economy ==
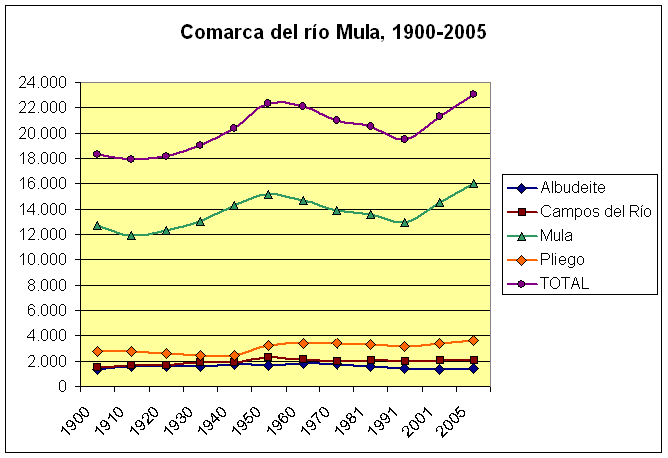
Demographic change of Mula (in green) compared to the entire district.

The economy of Mula rests upon dryland farming and ranching. Manufacturing in Mula is concentrated in the food and beverage sectors. The "El Arreaque" industrial park, to the east of the town center, was inaugurated in 2004.

== Main sights ==
=== Religious buildings ===
Saint Michael's church (la Parroquia de San Miguel) is located in Mula's City Hall Square (La Plaza del ayuntamiento de Mula). With its two towers, one of it a clock tower, the church forms a large monumental complex that often serves as logo of the municipality. This church suffered near-total destruction during the Spanish Civil War; only the entranceway was saved. The other decorative paintings and sculptures were destroyed. It is known that the canopy of the old altar and the wall paintings were done in the Baroque style. It was quite tall for its era.

The church contains two chapels: to the right, the Chapel of Marquesa (marchioness) Vélez, and to the left, the Chapel of San Felipe. The latter chapel contains relics of the saint brought from Sicily by Marquesa Vélez in 1648.

The church has an art museum made possible by a donation from Doña Pilar de la Canal, widow of Don Pedro Luis Blaya, in 1940. It collection spans from the 16th to the 20th century.

=== Castle of the Vélez Family ===
The castle was mentioned by Al-Idrisi, a 12th-century traveler, and by King Alfonso X. In the 15th century it had a massive wall to the north. There was one wall to protect the cisterns of the city and another wall to watch over the city's two parishes recently converted to Christianity; these walls have been preserved until today.

The architecture of the castle is Renaissance in its defensive character and simple forms, situated over a crag of rock. Of the two entrances, one of them accedes better to the high part of the wall and the towers of the old Muslim fortress in addition to a drawbridge. It contains four differentiating elements: the torre del homenaje, a central nave with a barrel vault, a structure semidetached from the nave, and a cistern. The cistern is an indication of Muslim influence because it is an essential element of a mosque.

=== Museums ===
- "El Cigarralejo": This museum's exhibition shows the remains, ceramics, and utensils of the Iberian epoch, which have been taken out from the ruins of a town, necropolis, and sanctuary of that time.
- Casa Pintada (many-colored house): This museum is located in a Renaissance palace; it contains a collection of many of the works of Cristobal Gabarrón.
- The "Castle of Alcalá" or castle of La Puebla, situated on a hill near the La Puebla district: This castle is Muslim, it is characterized by a gateway and the cisterns that supplied the water to the city.

== Culture ==
=== National contest of rapid painting ===
This is held each year on the second Sunday of November, coinciding with the Craft Bazaar "Las 4 Plazas". On the first occasion on November 11, 2007, 114 painters, coming from all over Spain, met on a sunny, spring-like day. It was a success that did not distance the residents and visitors, given the beauty and variety of places that Mula possesses.

=== Spanish Film Week ===
Since 1988 the "Segundo de Chomón Cinema Club" has been coming together as a denominational competition of the Spanish Film Week, and since 1993 the National Contest of Film Shorts. Both events are held each year in spring. It's an occasion to benefit from the actors, directors, and invitations to enjoy the historic resources, cultural inheritance, excellent temperature, and partake of the rich gastronomy of the region.

== Sports ==
In sports, Mula counts some swimming pools, situated around the football field. Mula has two municipal football fields (one of grass and the other waits to become artificial). There are a football pavilion, hall, "Grand Route" and a sports center with another pavilion, an outdoor pool, and tennis and basketball courts.

== Festivals ==
=== The night of the drums ===
The origin of the playing of the snare drum in Mula is difficult to narrow down, but seems to have taken place during the 14th century, as a form of protest. Presently, it is not clear that the first existing mention written of the playing the drum through the streets of Mula goes back to the municipal ordinances of 1859, where it is written that only those persons authorized through the Brotherhood of Carmen were allowed to go through the streets with snare drums, and only in the procession. For this reason, it is supposed that already at that time in the Holy Week of that year the people went out to play drums through the streets of Mula.

It is believed that this tradition of playing snare drums comes from the beginnings of the fourteenth century. It is possible that through the ages in which the playing of the drum in this locality, Holy Week, it could have been a form of religious demonstration, but it is not at all the case that the people of Mula begin to play drums in protest at the restrictions and prohibitions imposed by the civil and catholic authorities in the locality.

On the night between the Holy Tuesday and Holy Wednesday, in the plaza of the town hall, thousands of people dressed up in black tunics with huge drums congregate in and around the plaza outside the town hall. A few minutes before the clock strikes 12, the street lights in the plaza are dimmed and all goes silent. Suddenly all the drummers raise their hands above their heads and create a beat by banging their sticks together. A brass fanfare group joins in and finalise the end of the introduction. A few seconds then pass and the ground begins to tremble and shake and as the snare drums begin to play at once, the ground begins to tremble. Men, women and children march the streets all night beating upon their drums in a repetitive beat. The drumming continues the night long into the next day and often after that.

=== The Mula snare drum ===
The design of the snare drum in this town is fabricated in a home-made form by craftsmen from Mula. The design of the drums may have changed over the length of the years, perhaps losing something of the originality, taking many of the elements of neighbouring Moratalla, but moving toward perfection in many perceptions.

The instruments, whose diameters rarely exceeded 45 centimeters, were accompanied by drumsticks with fine points, which were used for drum rolls and for playing without applying much force. Today, larger drums measuring 55, 60 or 65 centimeters in diameter are preferred, along with drumsticks with mallet-shaped heads, which allow the player to strike the drum skin with greater force.

The method of manufacturing the drum also has changed. In the past it was not possible to commission a blacksmith for a box and screws. The people used their ingenuity with laths, to constitute the base of the drum. In those cases the skins were tightened using some holes punched in the rings and winding a cord to constrict them. The snares made with the drum were previously made with intestines of animals. In the present day, the large snare drums of Mula are made with a metallic box and with metal screws to tighten, the snares are made from guitar cords.

=== Other celebrations ===
National Short Film Competition organized since 1993 by the Segundo de Chomón film club.

Easter and Semana Santa, along with Tamborada (night of the drums), declared as National Tourist Interest. Processions begin on Good Friday from the Church of San Miguel with the Via Crucis, and continue with the procession of Palm Sunday morning from Santo Domingo church to meet Pedro Leon nude in the Town Hall Square. The parades continue on Holy Wednesday from the Chapel of Carmen, Holy Thursday the procession of Jesus of Nazareth, and late in night the procession of Christ of the Asylum, and the Good Friday procession of the Holy Burial, leaving these three processions from Santo Domingo. On Easter Sunday, the procession of the Risen Christ descends from the Royal Monastery of the Incarnation to the Town Hall Square where 9 processional thrones meet each other.

Fiestas de San Isidro on the second Saturday of May, in honor of San Isidro Labrador, patron of the garden and field, basis of the local economy. Procession with the saint from the church of Santo Domingo in the morning, accompanied by choirs and dance groups and locals dressed in traditional costumes, to the Town Hall Square where it develops the Market "The Four Squares". "Bando huertano" on afternoon with floats towed by agricultural machinery, barracks and buildings that emulate typical of the garden, with distribution of sausages and vegetables. At night, festival and concert in Fair Park, where the parade ends.

Fair and Festivals of September, beginning with the descent of the image of gay Jesus Balate, September 8, from his Sanctuary to the Royal Monastery of the Incarnation, where the 11th is moved to the church of Santo Domingo for the Novena in his Honor. The Fair takes place from 19 to 25. Day 21 is celebrated the feast of the child Jesus, commemorating his appearance to the shepherd Fray Pedro de Jesus Botía in 1648, with morning religious services and evening procession through the streets of the city. 22, Pilgrimage to the return of the image to his temple, and cookouts around the sanctuary. On 23, the Feast of Our Lady of Carmen, with masses in the chapel and evening procession. 25, feast of the Patron Saint Philip Martir, with evening religious service in the church of San Miguel followed by procession. These days is celebrated the week of Theatre and Craft Fair of the Shire.

Market "The Four Squares" the second Sunday of each month at City Hall Plaza, except in summer months.

== Notable people ==
- Juan de la Cierva y Peñafiel, Spanish politician and lawyer
- Patric, footballer
- Pedro Leon, footballer
- Luis León Sánchez, cyclist
- Javi Garcia, footballer
- Gines Jesus Hernandez, ex-pope of the Palmarian Catholic Church

== See also ==
- List of municipalities in the Region of Murcia
