= Aledo =

Aledo may refer to:

- Aledo, Illinois
- Aledo, Texas
- Aledo, Spain
