= List of municipalities in the Region of Murcia =

Map of Spain with the province of Murcia highlighted

This is a list of the 45 municipalities in the province and autonomous community of Murcia, Spain, with their land areas and their populations at the Censuses of 2001, 2011 and 2021.

== List ==
Name	Area (km^{2})	Population (2001)	Population (2011)	Population (2021)
Abanilla	235.6	6,166	6,510	6,047
Abarán	114.9	12,513	13,157	13,080
Águilas	251.8	27,771	34,395	35,310
Albudeite	17.0	1,368	1,424	1,393
Alcantarilla	16.2	34,303	41,406	42,619
Los Alcázares	19.8	8,470	15,628	16,958
Aledo	49.7	1,017	1,044	1,084
Alguazas	23.7	7,068	9,356	9,819
Alhama de Murcia	311.6	16,316	20,560	22,475
Archena	16.4	14,964	18,426	19,492
Beniel	10.1	8,469	11,057	11,508
Blanca	87.3	5,787	6,448	6,573
Bullas	82.2	11,008	12,244	11,609
Calasparra	184.9	9,258	10,585	10,118
Campos del Río	47.3	2,046	2,201	2,064
Caravaca de la Cruz	858.8	22,963	26,088	25,659
Cartagena	558.0	184,686	215,757	215,826
Cehegín	299.3	14,418	15,946	14,935
Ceutí	10.3	7,696	10,899	12,286
Cieza	367.0	33,017	35,195	35,179
Fortuna	149.3	7,149	9,928	10,665
Fuente Álamo de Murcia	273.5	11,583	16,117	17,253
Jumilla	969.2	22,113	25,496	26,107
Librilla	56.5	3,925	4,812	5,394
Lorca	1,675.3	77,477	91,849	95,726
Lorquí	15.8	5,644	6,932	7,307
Mazarrón	318.9	20,841	34,422	33,377
Molina de Segura	169.5	46,905	66,771	73,593
Moratalla	954.9	8,595	8,305	7,807
Mula	634.1	14,611	17,082	17,124
Murcia	886.0	370,745	437,667	459,778
Ojós	45.3	579	578	501
Pliego	29.4	3,413	4,049	3,913
Puerto Lumbreras	144.7	11,331	14,502	16,219
Ricote	86.7	1,556	1,451	1,281
San Javier	75.1	20,125	31,901	33,489
San Pedro del Pinatar	22.3	16,678	23,981	26,465
Santomera	44.2	11,726	15,547	16,116
Torre-Pacheco	189.4	24,332	33,419	37,039
Las Torres de Cotillas	38.8	16,450	21,478	21,907
Totana	288.9	24,657	30,733	32,835
Ulea	40.0	970	926	866
La Unión	24.8	14,541	18,965	20,560
Villanueva del Río Segura	13.2	1,572	2,440	3,271
Yecla	605.6	30,824	34,448	35,052
Totals		1,197,646	1,462,125	1,518,279

== See also ==
- Geography of Spain
- List of cities in Spain
