= Castle of Bullas =

Castle in the Region of Murcia, Spain

Castillo de Bullas
- Bullas

Site information
- Type: Castle

Site history
- Battles/wars: Mudéjar revolt of 1264–1266

Garrison information
- Garrison: Templar Order; Emirate of Granada; Order of Santiago
- Occupants: Fernán Pérez de Guzmán

The castle of Bullas is a castle located in Peña Rubia de Cehegín, Bullas, Murcia.

Of muslim origin, it was built between the XII and XIII centuries, before the Castilian conquest. After the Mudéjar revolt of 1264–1266, it was given to the Templar Order together with the neighbouring area.

In 1286 it was entrusted to the Emirate of Granada, causing the treachery of king Sancho IV of Castile.

Later on, Fernán Pérez de Guzmán and the Knights Templar recovered it. After the abolition of the order in 1312, it belonged to the Order of Santiago.

In the XVII and XVIII centuries, the castle's stones were used for the construction of homes. Nowadays only remnants survive of the Casco Viejo.
