= Las Torres de Cotillas =

- Municipality
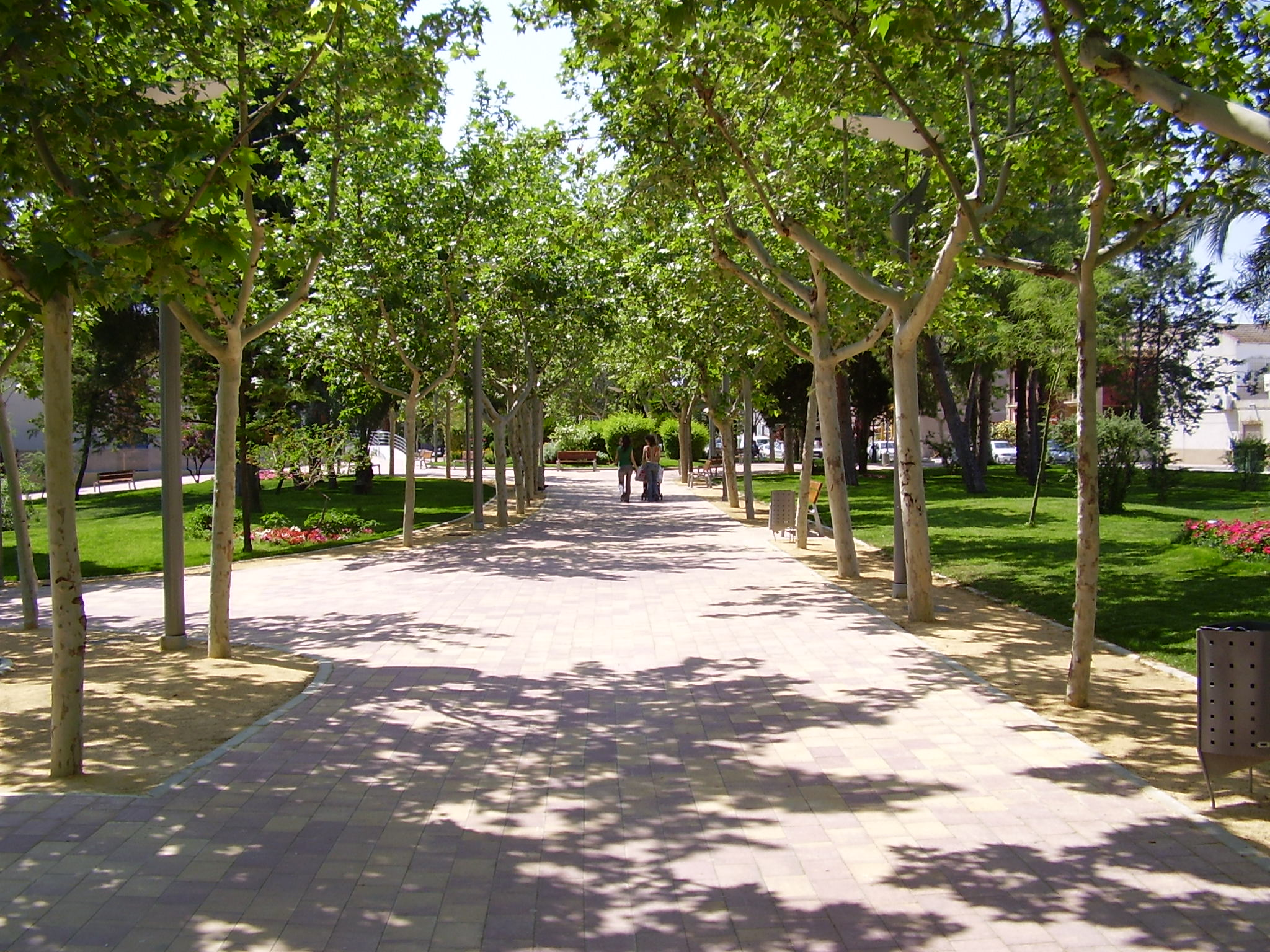

- Coat of arms

- Location in Murcia

- Location in Murcia Location in Spain
- Country: Spain
- Autonomous community: Region of Murcia
- Province: Region of Murcia
- Comarca: Vega Media del Segura
- Judicial district: Molina de Segura

Government
  - Mayor: Domingo Coronado (PP)

Area
  - Total: 38 km^{2} (15 sq mi)
- Elevation: 82 m (269 ft)

Population (2025-01-01)
  - Total: 22,676
  - Density: 600/km^{2} (1,500/sq mi)
- Demonym: Torreños
- Time zone: UTC+1 (CET)
  - Summer (DST): UTC+2 (CEST)
- Postal code: 30565
- Website: Official website

Las Torres de Cotillas is a Spanish municipality in the autonomous community of Murcia and is located in the eastern half.

A Roman villa existed here in the 2nd century BC. Despite the presence of two Moorish settlements in the Middle Ages, the modern town was founded in 1318.

West of Torres de Cotillas at 38°1'35"N 1°15'15"W there is a 186 metres tall guyed radio mast used for mediumwave broadcasting on 855 kHz with 100 kW.

The Segura River traverses the western third of the municipality.

== Geography ==
The inhabitants are distributed in the following localities: Las Torres de Cotillas, which is located in the south-west of the northeastern quarter and is inhabited by 16,645 people; La Florida, which occurs in the north-east and is home to 921 people; La Loma, which is placed in the northeastern quarter and has a population of 202; Los Pulpites, which is located in the southeastern quarter and is inhabited by 514; La Media Legua, which occurs in the southeastern quarter and is home to 404 people; Campo de Abajo, where 252 live; Campo de Arriba, which population consists of 221; La Condomina, which is inhabited by 197 people; El Coto, which has a population of 644; Huerta de Abajo, which is home to 328 people; Huerta de Arriba, which population consists of 95; Los Matías, which is inhabited by 71 people; Pago Tocino, which is home to 78 people and Parque de Las Palmeras, where 538 live.

== Demographics ==
Almost 7.098% inhabitants are foreigners – 1.02% come from other country of Europe, 4.16% are Africans, 1.64% are Americans and 0.27% are Asians. The table below shows the population trends during the 21st century by its five-year periods:

	2001	2006	2011	2016
Population	12,871	14,824	16,526	16,265

== Economy ==
25.7% of the territory is used for crop grow purposes and the most widely grown products are the peaches and the lemons. 7.96% agreements in the municipality were written for jobs in the agriculture and fishing sectors in 2019. 67.37% agreements were written for jobs in the industry sector, 21.61% agreements were signed by metal production and transformation operators, 18.25% agreements were signed by tinned fruits and vegetables workers and non alcoholic drinks producers, 15.95% agreements were signed by manufacture labourers and 5.13% agreements were signed by technicians in the control of metal production processes in the second half of 2016.

== Facilities ==
=== Healthcare ===
Las Torres de Cotillas is part of the Health Area VI (Vega Media del Segura) of the healthcare system of the Region of Murcia. A consultorio (primary care centre with the fewest functions) is located in Los Pulpites and a centro de salud (primary care centre) is placed in the main town.

=== Education ===
Six early childhood and primary education centres (CEIP) are located in the municipality as well as two secondary education centres (IES).

== See also ==
- List of municipalities in the Region of Murcia

== Festivities ==
- Carnival
- Holy Week
- Patron saint festivity: it is held in the early October.
