= Ulea =

- Municipality
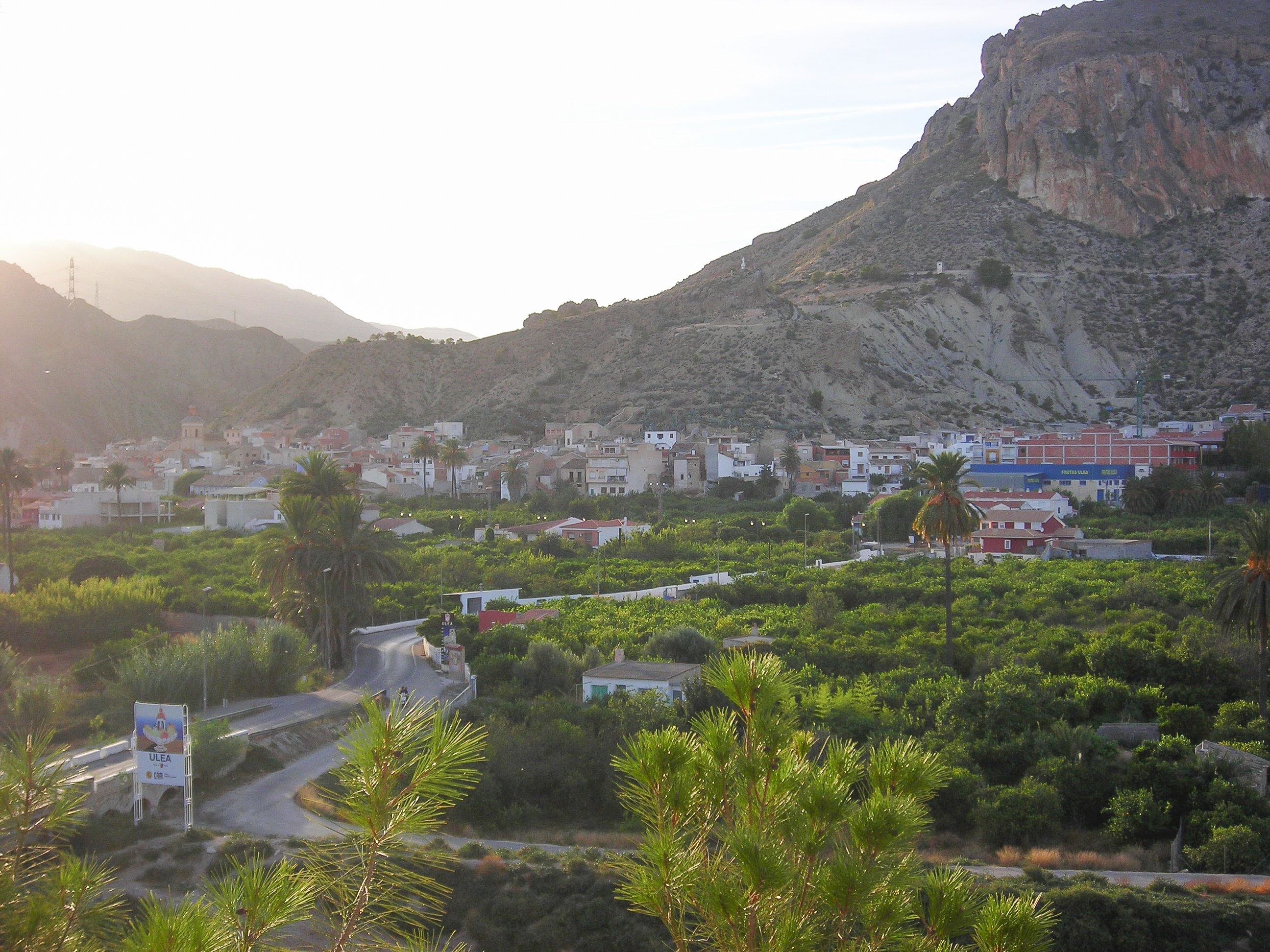
- Town hall

- Coat of arms

- Location of Ulea in Region of Murcia.

- Location in Murcia Location in Spain
- Coordinates: 38°08′27″N 1°19′47″W
- Country: Spain
- A. community: Region of Murcia
- Province: Region of Murcia
- Comarca: Valle de Ricote
- Judicial district: Cieza

Government
  - Mayor: Víctor Manuel López Abenza

Area
  - Total: 42.5 km^{2} (16.4 sq mi)
- Elevation: 126 m (413 ft)

Population (2025-01-01)
  - Total: 926
  - Density: 21.8/km^{2} (56.4/sq mi)
- Website: Official website

Ulea is a Spanish municipality in the autonomous community of Murcia. It has a population of 991 (2007) and an area of 40 km^{2} (15 mi^{2}).

== Economy ==
The economy of the town is based mainly on agriculture (oranges, lemons, apricots, pears and peaches) and its subsequent packaging and export of the products.

The existing services are represented for the most part by the dependencies of the City Council and by the Public School "Santa Cruz". Although it also has Medical Office, Local Employment Center, Care Center for the elderly, Municipal Pool and Cultural Center where it is also a meeting room and pensioners club, a Public Library with an extensive bibliography and a yoga retreat.

== See also ==
- List of municipalities in the Region of Murcia
