= Alguazas =

- Municipality
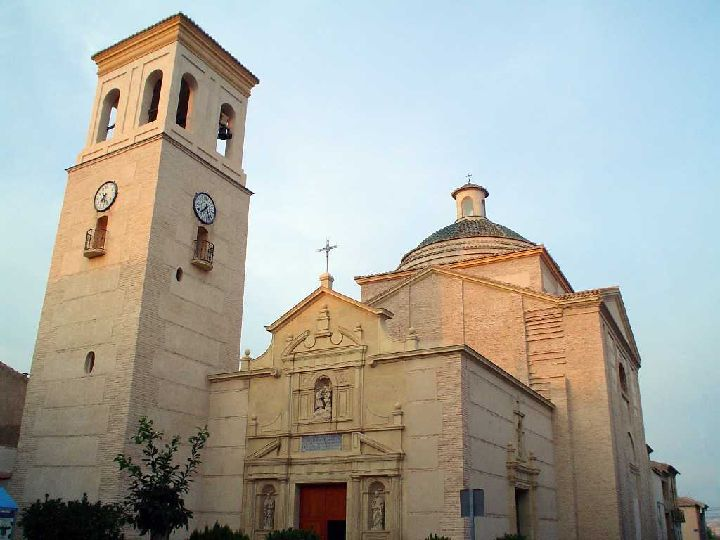

- Flag Coat of arms

- Location in Murcia

- Location in Murcia Location in Spain
- Country: Spain
- A. community: Murcia
- Province: Murcia
- Comarca: Vega Media del Segura

Government
  - Mayor: José Antonio Fernández Lladó

Area
  - Total: 23.74 km^{2} (9.17 sq mi)
- Elevation: 86 m (282 ft)

Population (2025-01-01)
  - Total: 10,431
  - Density: 439.4/km^{2} (1,138/sq mi)
- Demonym: Alguaceños
- Website: Official website

Alguazas (Spanish: [alˈɣwaθas]) is a municipality of Spain in the autonomous community and province of Murcia and it is located in the south-west of the northeastern quarter.

== Geography ==
The inhabitants are distributed in the following localities: Alguazas, which is located in the southeastern quarter and had a population of 9,108 in 2020; Las Pullas, which occurs in the north and was inhabited by 137 people; El Paraje, which occurs in the south-east and was home to 183 people; Lo Campoo, which population consisted of 48; El Colmenar, where 8 people lived; Los Pardos, which had a population of 109; and Torre Los Frailes, which was inhabited by 64 people.

== Demographics ==
13.728% inhabitants are foreigners – 2.018% come from other country of Europe, 9.03% are Africans, 2.32% are Americans and 0.297 are Asians. The table below shows the population trends in the 20th and 21st centuries:

	1900	1910	1920	1930	1940	1950	1960	1970	1981	1991	2001	2006	2011	2016
Population	2,579	2,910	3,169	3,349	4,063	4,226	5,079	4,886	5,782	6,931	7,068	8,177	9,288	9,613

== Economy ==
31.8% surface is utilised for crop grow purposes and the most widely grown products are the lemons, the peaches, the apricots and the tangerines. 17.21% agreements were written for jobs in the agriculture and fishing sectors, 41.26% agreements emerged for jobs in the services sector, 36.649% were written for jobs in the industry sector in 2019 and 47.74% agreements were signed by labourers in manufacture industries in the first half of 2016.

== Facilities ==
=== Healthcare ===
A consultorio (primary care centre with the fewest functions) and a centro de salud (primary care centre) are located in the main town and another consultorio is placed in El Paraje.

=== Education ===
An early childhood and primary education centre (CEIP), a primary and secondary education centre and a secondary education centre (IES) occur in the main town.

== See also ==
- List of municipalities in the Region of Murcia
