= Puerto Lumbreras =

- Municipality
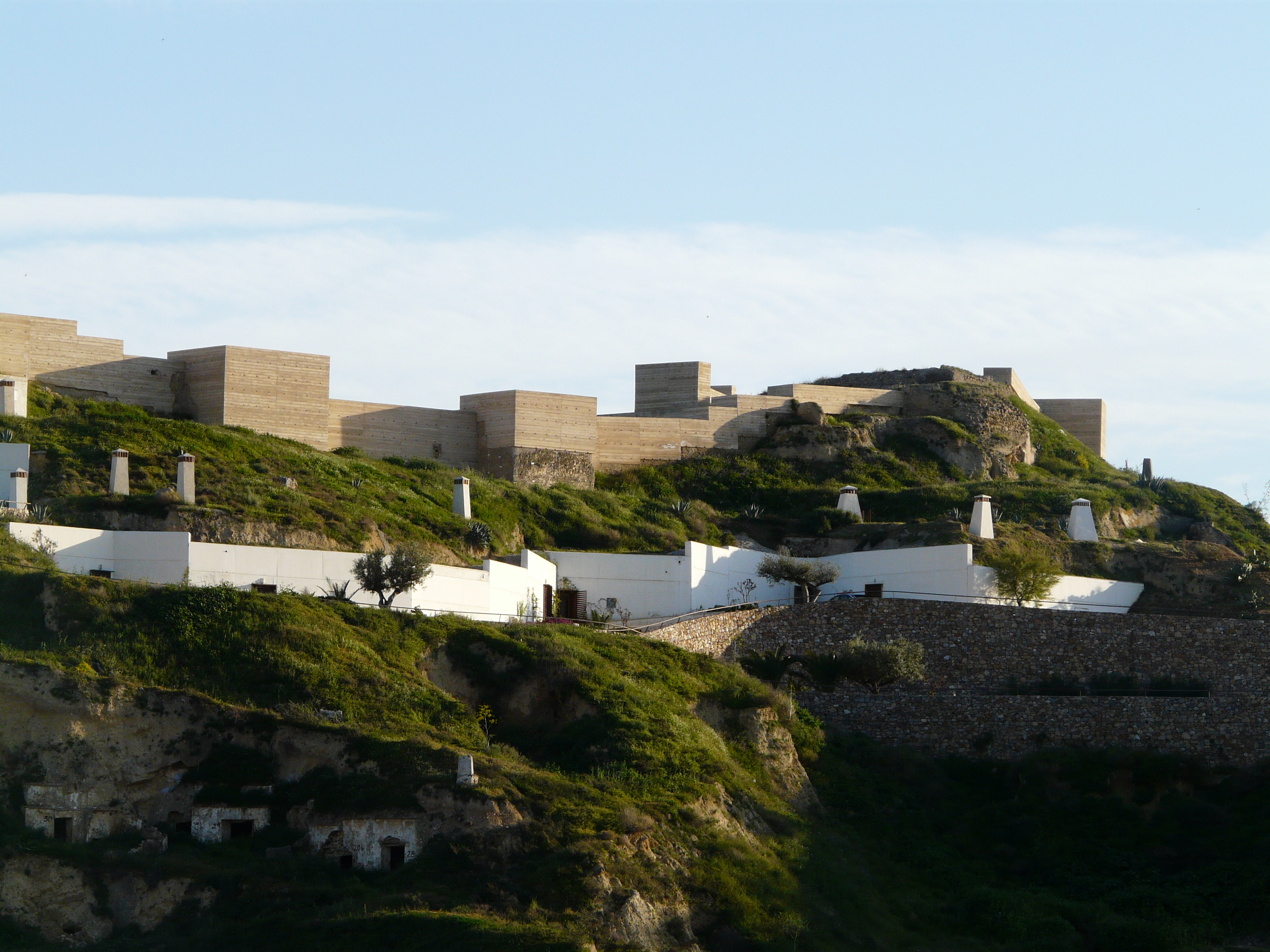
- Castle of Nogalte

- Flag Coat of arms

- Location in Murcia

- Location in Murcia Location in Spain
- Country: Spain
- Autonomous Community: Region of Murcia
- Province: Region of Murcia
- Comarca: Alto Guadalentín
- Own municipality: 1958

Government
  - Mayor: María Ángeles Túnez García (PP)

Area
  - Total: 338 km^{2} (131 sq mi)
- Elevation (AMSL): 465 m (1,526 ft)

Population (2025-01-01)
  - Total: 18,006
  - Density: 53.3/km^{2} (138/sq mi)
- Time zone: UTC+1 (CET)
  - Summer (DST): UTC+2 (CEST (GMT +2))
- Postal code: 30890
- Area code: +34 (Spain) + 968 (Murcia)
- Website: Official website

Puerto Lumbreras (Spanish: [ˈpweɾto lumˈbɾeɾas]) is a Spanish municipality in the autonomous community of Murcia. It has a population of 15,780 (2020) and an area of 139 km^{2} . It is located in the southwestern end of Region of Murcia and is adjacent to Andalusia.

== History ==
The municipality has been inhabited by human beings since the Upper Palaeolithic. There was also human occupancy during the Bronze Age, specifically by people belonging to the argaric culture. During the Roman Hispania era, this current municipality was also inhabited by people. There was also human presence in Puerto Lumbreras during the Islamic Iberian Peninsula era in the High Middle Ages.

== Geography ==
=== Physical geography ===
The western half of the municipality is more raised than the eastern half. The Rambla de Nogalte traverses the territory from the northeastern quarter to the east and also traverses the main town. Part of the western end of the municipality is occupied by two mountains –Cabezo de Jara and Collado de Media Legua. They do not exclusively occur in Puerto Lumbreras and also occupies part of the adjacent municipality, but they mostly occur in this municipality. Part of the south-west end of the territory is occupied by the northern half of Sierra de Enmedio mountain range.

=== Human geography ===
The municipality is demarcated with four districts named diputaciones – Cabezo de la Jara, where 6 people live; Puerto Lumbreras, inhabited by 12,732 people; Esparragal, where 2,907 people live and Puerto Adentro, which has a population of 132.

In El Esparragal, the following localities occur: Ermita, where 150 people live; Estación, which has a population of 530; and El Esparragal, which is home to 2,227 people. In Puerto Adentro, the following localities can be found: Góñar, where 47 people reside; and Puerto Adentro, which is inhabited by 85 people. In Puerto Lumbreras, the following localities are present: Las Casicas, which is home to 55 people; and Puerto Lumbreras, where 12,677 reside.

== Demographics ==
16.22% inhabitants are foreigners – 2.93% are from other countries of Europe, 10.75% are Africans, 2.819% are Americans, and 0.279% are Asians. The table below shows the population trend during the 20th and 21st centuries by the beginning of their decades.

	1960	1970	1981	1991	2001	2011
Population	7,205	8,046	8,560	9,961	11,331	14,502

== Economy ==
35.6% territory is utilised as crop lands and the most widely grown products are almonds, olives and lettuces. 47.82% agreements were written for jobs of the agriculture and fishing sector in 2019 and 45.74% agreements were written for jobs of the service sector.

== Facilities ==
=== Healthcare ===
Puerto Lumbreras is included in the Health area III (Lorca) of Region of Murcia. Two consultorios (primary care centres with the fewest functions) and one centro de salud (primary care centre) can be seen in the main town.

=== Education ===
The main town hosts 3 early childhood and primary education centres (CEIP) and 1 secondary education centre (IES). Another early childhood and primary education centre is located in El Esparragal.

== Main sights ==
Some buildings and places with cultural, historic, or environmental special values in Puerto Lumbreras are listed below.

- Castle of Nogalte: It was built during the Islamic Iberian Peninsula era in the High Middle Ages.
- Casa del Cura: It was built in the 18th century. The parcel of Casa del Cura is composed of three elements: a main building, an attached structure and an aljibe (a kind of cistern).
- Casa de Los Duendes and Augusto Vels Museum: The Casa de Los duendes is located in the historic centre of the town and was built in the 19th century. The building is currently used for an exhibition about graphology and other temporary exhibitions. Several workshops and conferences also take place in this building.
- Earth shelters
- Interpretation centre: it is placed in the west of the municipality. This centre addresses issues such as the environment of the area, its landscape, its flora, its fauna and the human beings of the municipality from a historical view.
- Astronomy observatory: it is located in the west of the municipality and was opened in 2001.
- Cabezo de la Jara spot: Cabezo de la Jara is the highest mountain in the municipality and is 1,247 metres high. In the spot the border among Puerto Lumbreras, Vélez-Rubio and Huércal-Overa occurs. A youth hostel is present in the spot as well as the interpretation centre. Several pit caves can also be found in the mountain.

== Festivities ==
- Patron saint festivity: It is held in the first week of October. An opening address occurs and next a rocket-shaped firework as a festive inaugurating act (this is named chupinazo). A flea market with medieval appearance is placed during the last days of the festive period.

=== Festivities in other localities ===
- Festivity in El Esparragal: It occurs during the first third of December. Some activities such as a fair of equine cattle, a paddle tournament, a flower placement at the Virgin’s altar, a popular race and a pétanque tournament are performed during this festive period.
- Festivity in Goñar: It is held in August.
- Niño de Nápoles Festivity: It is held in the third weekend of January.

== See also ==
- List of municipalities in the Region of Murcia

== Gallery ==
Location of Puerto Lumbreras.

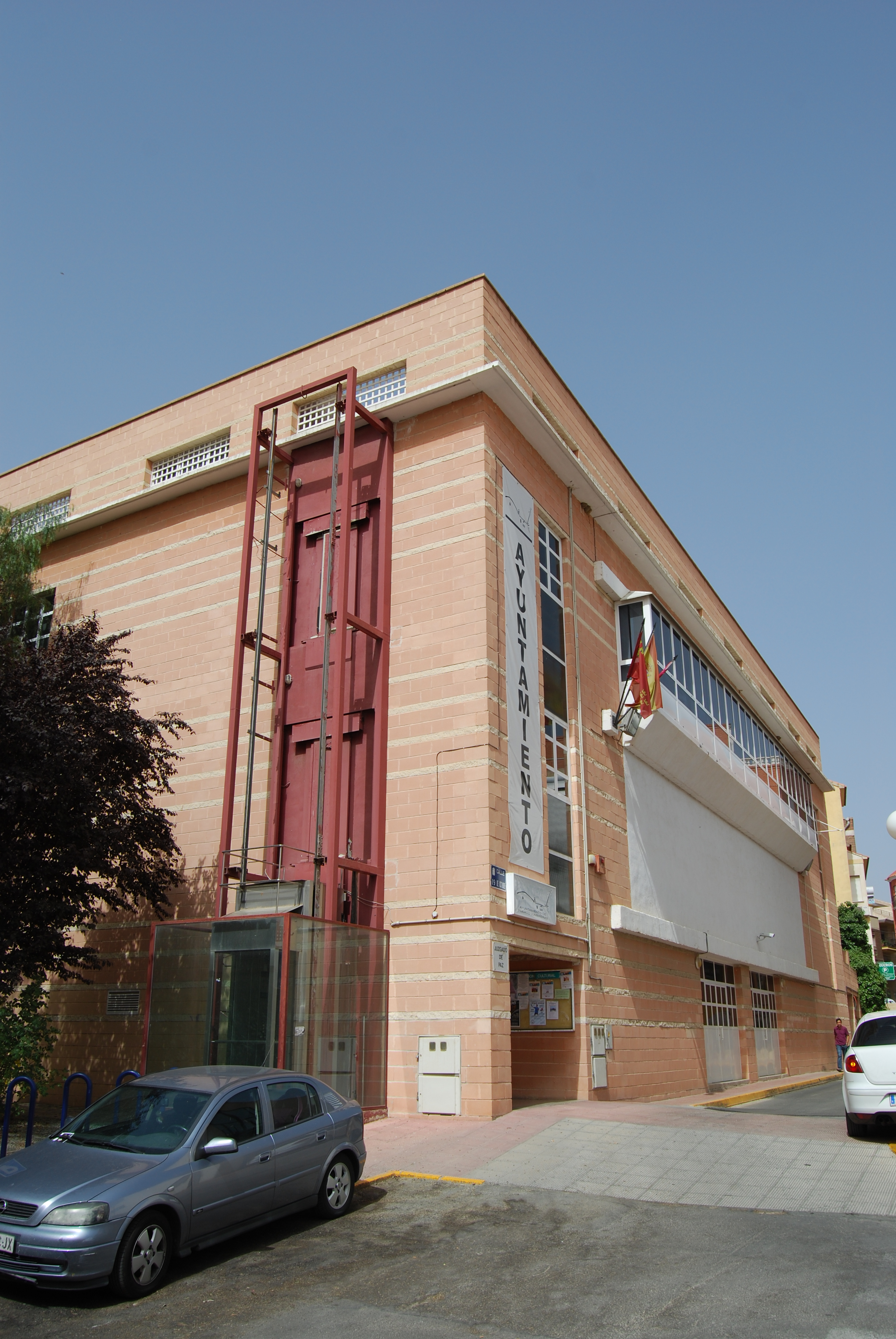
Puerto Lumbreras City Office in Doctor Salvador Caballeo Garcia area

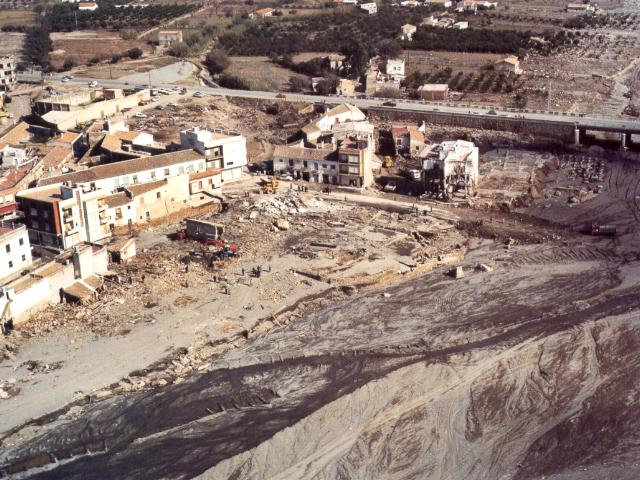
Picture show by flood damage in Puerto Lumreras in October 1973
