= Villanueva del Río Segura =

- Municipality
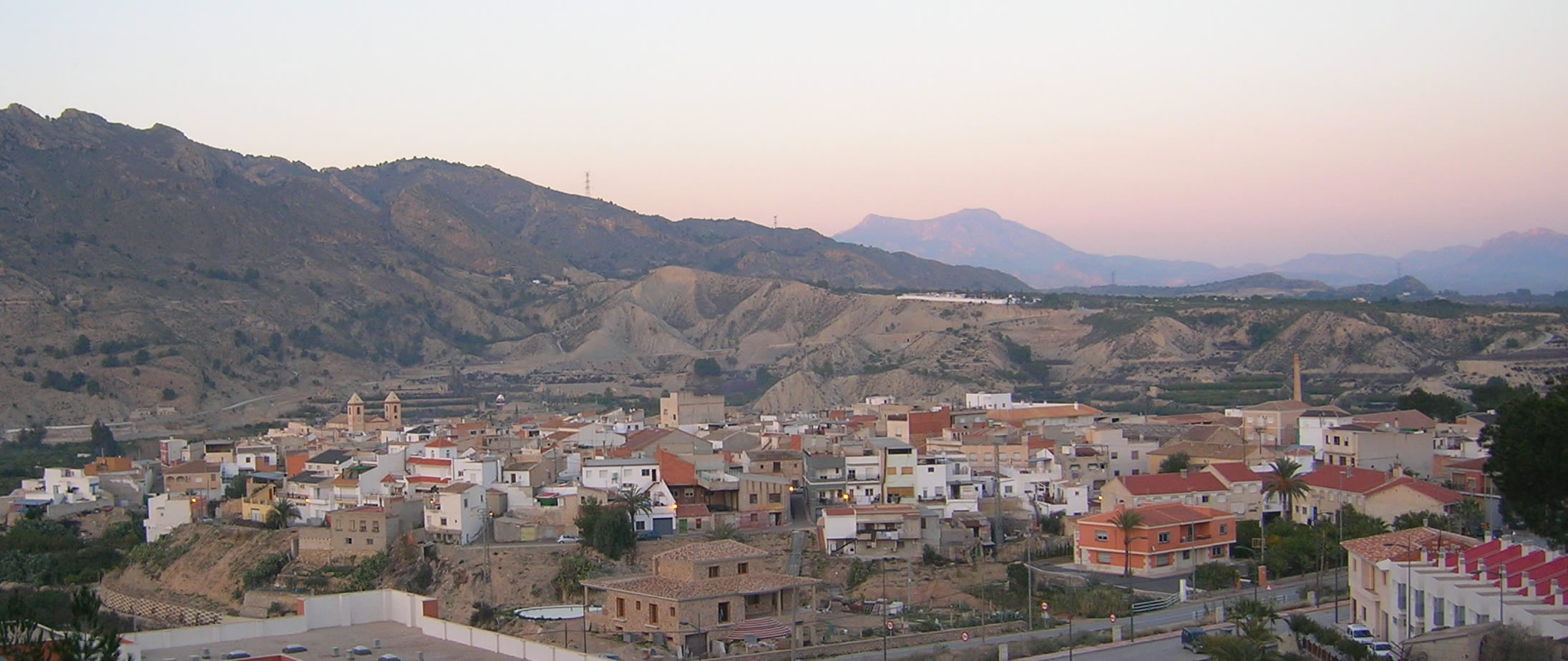
- Town hall.

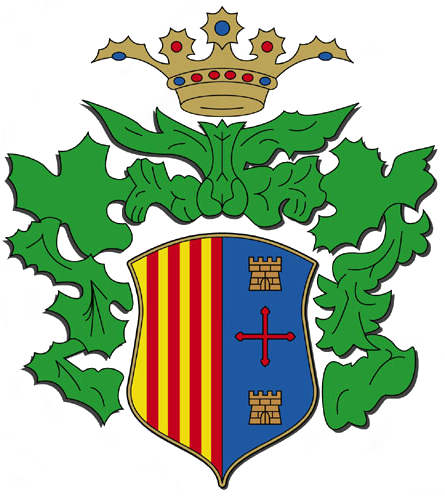
- Coat of arms

- Location in Murcia

- Location in Murcia Location in Spain
- Country: Spain
- Autonomous community: Region of Murcia
- Province: Region of Murcia
- Comarca: Valle de Ricote
- Judicial district: Cieza

Government
  - Mayor: José Luis López Ayala

Area
  - Total: 13 km^{2} (5.0 sq mi)
- Elevation: 135 m (443 ft)

Population (2025-01-01)
  - Total: 4,111
  - Density: 320/km^{2} (820/sq mi)
- Demonym: Villanovenses or Villanoveros
- Website: Official website

Villanueva del Río Segura is a municipality in the Region of Murcia, Spain.

== See also ==
- List of municipalities in the Region of Murcia
