= Ricote =

- Municipality
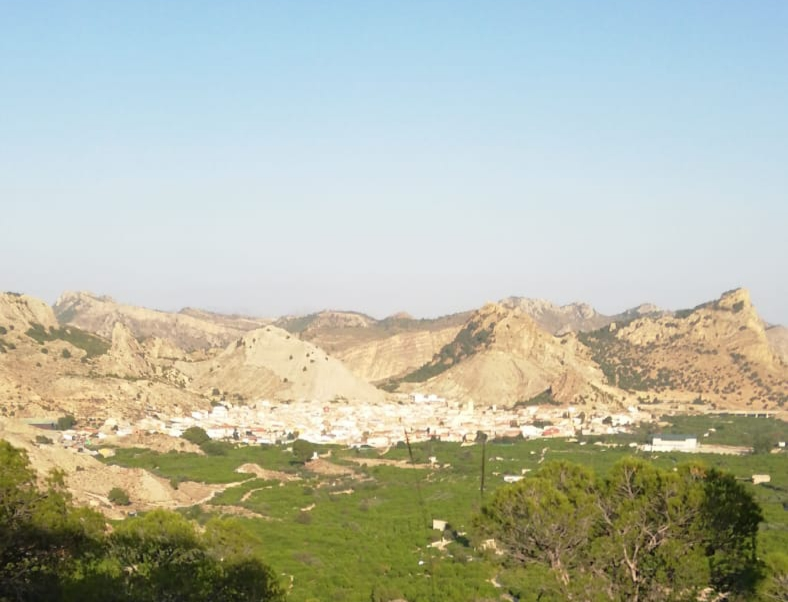
- View of Ricote

- Coat of arms

- Location in Murcia

- Location in Murcia Location in Spain
- Country: Spain
- Autonomous Community: Region of Murcia
- Province: Region of Murcia

Area
  - Total: 86.7 km^{2} (33.5 sq mi)
- Elevation (AMSL): 297 m (974 ft)

Population (2025-01-01)
  - Total: 1,197
  - Density: 13.8/km^{2} (35.8/sq mi)
- Time zone: UTC+1 (CET)
  - Summer (DST): UTC+2 (CEST (GMT +2))
- Area code: +34 (Spain) + 968 (Murcia)
- Website: Official website

Ricote is a Spanish municipality in the autonomous community of Murcia. It has a population of 1,509 (2004) and an area of 87.7 km^{2}.

Ricote had a community of Moriscos until their expulsion from Spain in 1609. Govert Westerveld and Francisco Márquez Villanueva believe that the name of the Morisco character Ricote in Don Quixote is derived from the village. The Muslim philosopher Ibn Sab'in (1217-1271) is said to be descended from a family originally from Ricote.

== Demographics ==
3.79% of the inhabitants were foreigners in 2019. 2.21% are Africans, 1.34% are Americans. The table below shows the population trends.

	1900	1910	1920	1930	1940	1950	1960	1970	1981	1991	2001	2011
Population	2,604	3,022	2,819	2,956	2,929	2,928	2,743	2,320	1,774	1,689	1,556	1,461

== Economy ==
23.2% of the surface is utilised as crop lands. The most widely grown products are the almonds, the lemons and the olives. 48.21 agreements were written for jobs in agriculture and fishing sector in 2019, and 35.16% were signed by crop lands labourers in the second half of 2016. 46.87% were written by enterprises of the service sector, and 13.19% were signed by waiters. Only 1.78% of the agreements occurred in the industry sector. Since the onset of Covid in 2018 the local economy in Ricote Valley has been growing as rentals of rural houses with no neighbours has become a source of income for locals. Thanks to apps like booking.com, airbnb, and Spaniards' desire to vacation without neighbours this region of Spain has experienced a small boom in its economy. There are, as of January 2021, 298 country houses for rent, more than in any other part of Spain. As well since 2020 the building industry has taken notice of the post covid trend to build bedroom communities in the Ricote valley where Murcia residents live all year, not just on weekends or summer. The travel is 35 minutes to Murcia city.

== Facilities ==
The municipality is home to a consultorio(a primary care centre with the fewest functions), an early childhood and primary education centre and a library.

== Main sights ==
Some buildings with architectural and history values are listed below:

- Palacio de la Encomienda de Santiago
- Palacio de Llamas: It was built in 1702.
- San Sebastián Parish Church: It was built in the 18 century.

== See also ==
- List of municipalities in the Region of Murcia
