= Pliego =

- Municipality
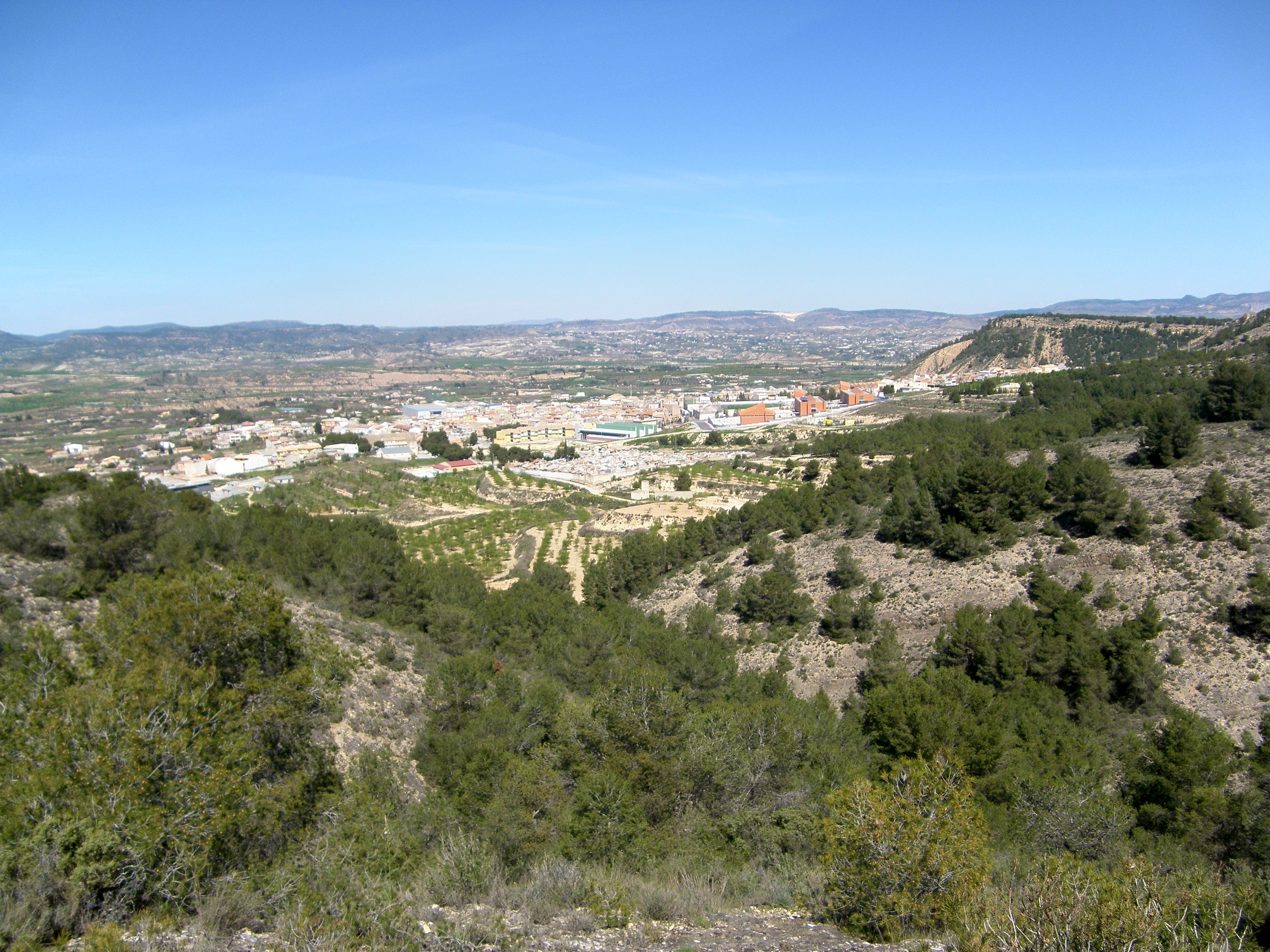

- Coat of arms

- Location in Murcia

- Location in Murcia Location in Spain
- Country: Spain
- Autonomous community: Murcia
- Province: Murcia

Government
  - Mayor: Antonio Huéscar Pérez

Area
  - Total: 29 km^{2} (11 sq mi)
- Elevation: 308 m (1,010 ft)

Population (2025-01-01)
  - Total: 4,003
  - Density: 140/km^{2} (360/sq mi)
- Time zone: UTC+1 (CET)
  - Summer (DST): UTC+2 (CEST)
- Website: Official website

Pliego is a municipality in the autonomous region of Murcia in southeastern Spain. It is situated in the Comarca del Río Mula. It has a population of 3,868 (INE 2021). It is a small town near the beautiful Mountain Nature Park of the nearby Sierra Espuna Mountains with surrounding countryside of olive, almonds and apricot groves.

Latitude: 37º 58' 59" N

Longitude: 001º 30' 00" O.

The municipality is located on the north slope of the Sierra Espuna mountains. It is in the meadow created by the Pliego river, a tributary of the Mula river, a current that flows into the Segura river.

The municipality is an enclave, surrounded on all sides by Mula.

Pliego is a semi-historical Spanish town with a mainly Spanish population with some English residents and other nationalities who have settled there. The municipality consists of old and new architecture with a central Town Square and Town Hall.

The geography of Pliego allows for hiking, rock-climbing, mountain biking, and spelunking.

It has all other amenities, a Church, banks, post-office, doctors surgery, large supermarket, shops, eating-places, bars and weekly open market. It is close to the larger town of Mula, the motorway, the City of Murcia, airports and many coastal towns.

== See also ==
- River Mula
- List of municipalities in the Region of Murcia
