= Aledo, Spain =

Aledo
- Municipality
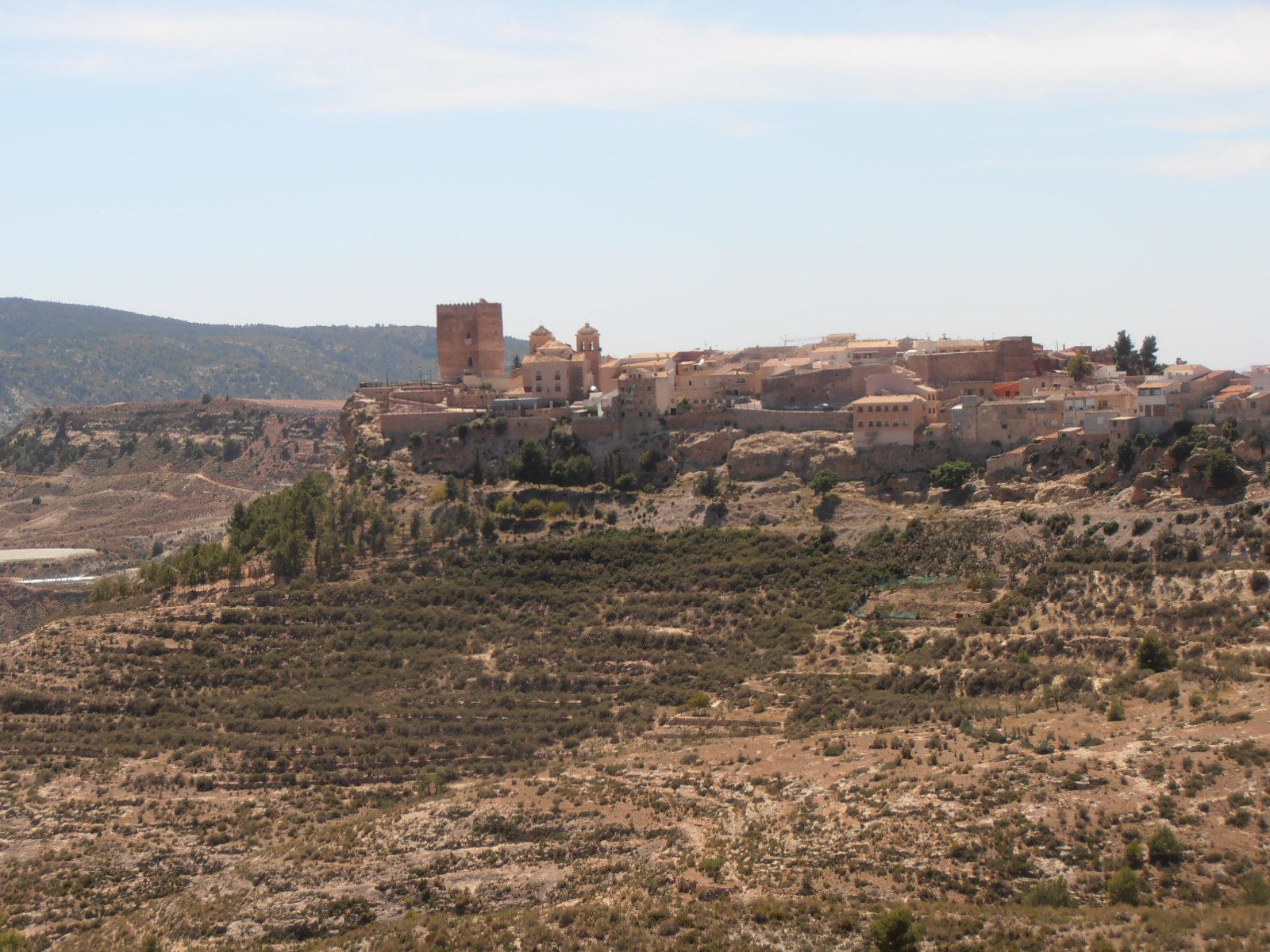

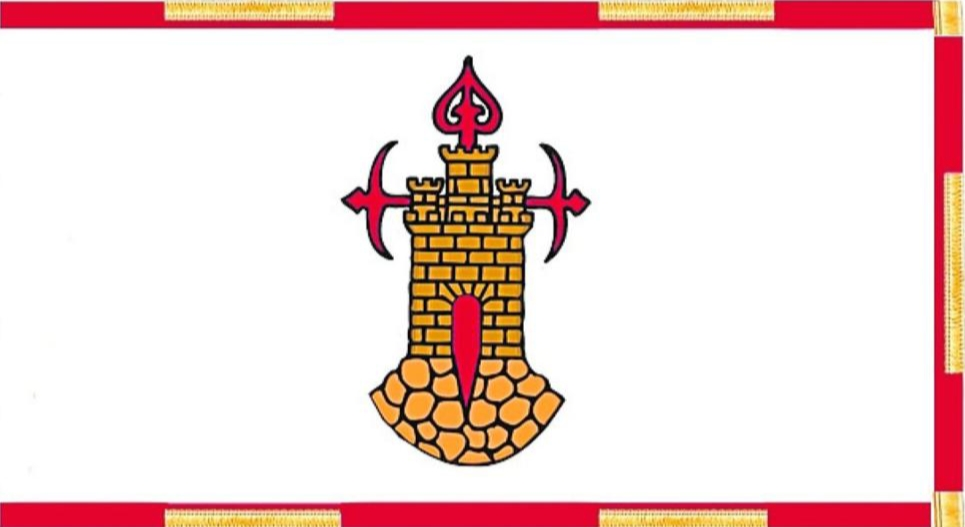
- Flag Coat of arms

- Location in Murcia

- Location in Murcia Location in Spain
- Country: Spain
- Autonomous community: Murcia
- Province: Murcia
- Comarca: Bajo Guadalentín
- Judicial district: Totana

Government
  - Mayor: Francisco Javier Andreo Cánovas (Aledo Avanza)

Area
  - Total: 49.74 km^{2} (19.20 sq mi)
- Elevation: 625 m (2,051 ft)

Population (2025-01-01)
  - Total: 1,123
  - Density: 22.58/km^{2} (58.48/sq mi)
- Demonym: Aledanos
- Website: Official website

Aledo is a municipality in the Region of Murcia, southern Spain.

It is home to a castle built during the early Middle Ages by the Moors, to command the Guadalentín valley. When the Taifa of Murcia was conquered by the Kingdom of Castile, it was assigned to the Order of Santiago, who renovated it and added the Torre del Homenaje.

== History ==
The municipality has been inhabited since the Upper Palaeolithic. There are remains of that presence in the archaeological site Cabezo de las Cuevas. The current municipality was also scene of human residence in the Calcolthic. The proof of that is a site named La Agualeja that consists mainly in small remains of a wall. There is also evidence of human occupancy in the Bronze Age, specifically of people belonging the Argaric civilization. It consists in another archaeological site named Los Allozos II and it was a typical Argaric settlement which was located on a hillock.

During the Roman Hispania Era there was also human presence and one evidence of that fact are the archaeological sites named Juncarejo and Juncarejo II. The site consists of remains of a building structure and the rests of another which is placed in the first one. That could be remains of a burial site.

The most documentary references of Aledo date back to 896 A.D. In the document, the town was mentioned as a hisn. In that most part of the Iberian Peninsula was under rule of Muslim governments.

In the 11th century the castle of Aledo began to be built. In the last years of that century the king Alfonso VI of León and Castile started to conquer back the territories under Muslim rule. In the year 1086 Aledo was taken.

In the year 1092 the king Yusuf Ben Texufin got siege laid with the support of troops from Sevilla, Almería, Granada and Murcia. After two more sieges the Muslim side turned out in conquering back Aledo.

In the year 1243 the Treaty of Alcaraz was signed. In that document a vassalage of the Taifa of Murcia was agreed. However, Aledo, Lorca, Mula and Cartagena rejected the treaty. Aledo was conquered back by the Christians in the year 1244.

After the Reconquista of the Taifa of Murcia was repopulated, but Aledo was repopulated several decades later.

In that era Aledo was located near the border with the Muslim Emirate of Granada and that

As the Emirate of Granada was conquered back, the border position of Aledo came to an end. That lead it to a stagnation of the area and to an increase to Totana, a current municipality which was in that era part of the municipality of Aledo.

During the 16th century the population of Totana increased whereas the population of Aledo decreased.

An uprising of the year 1520 named Revolt of the Comuneros the fortress of Aledo and the town itself resulted highly damaged. That promoted that Totana became capital of the municipality and Aledo became a neighbourhood of Totana.

In the 18th century, Aledo and Totana split and became two different municipalities.

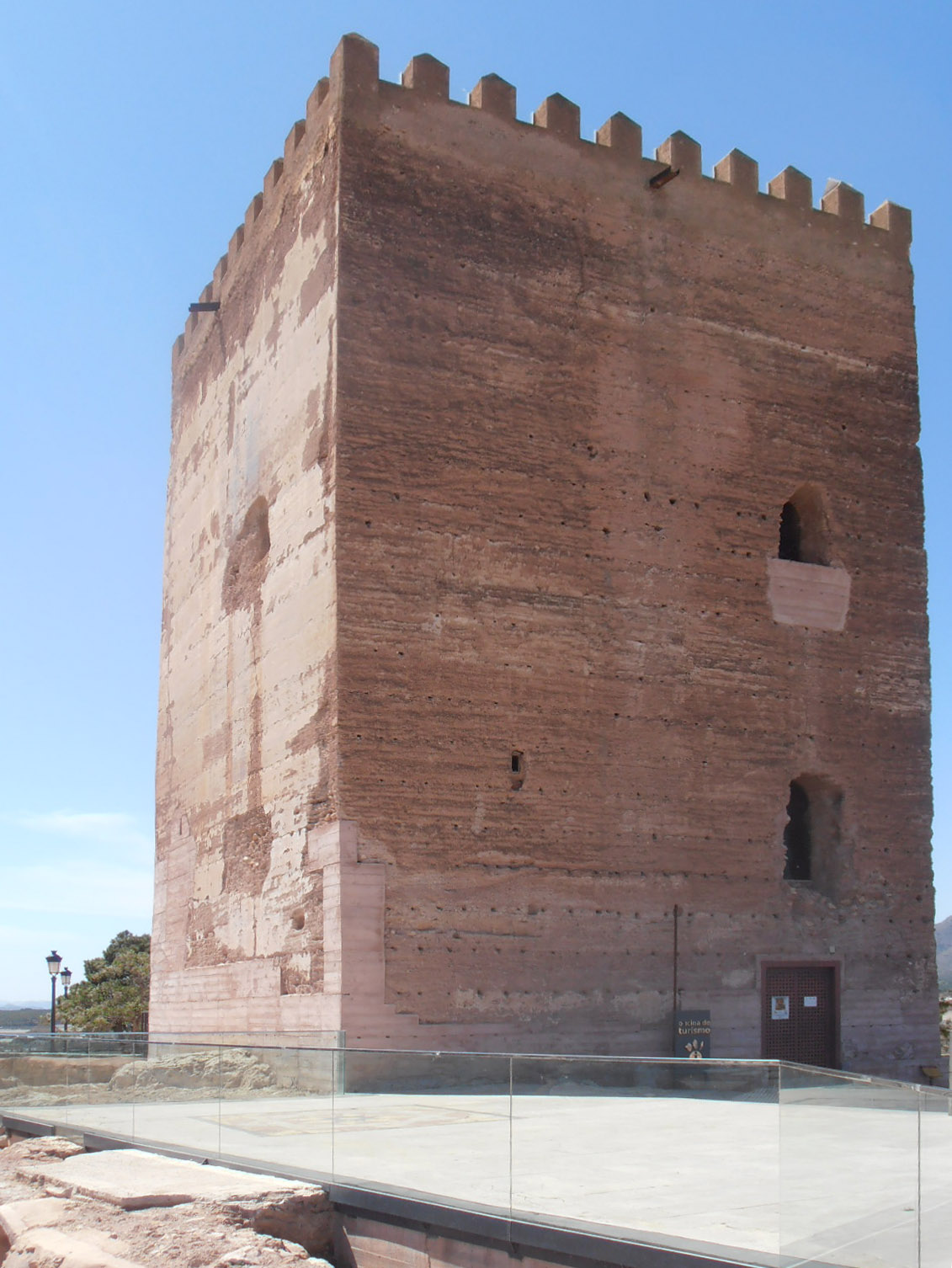
Homenaje Tower (Torre del Homenaje) in Aledo Castle

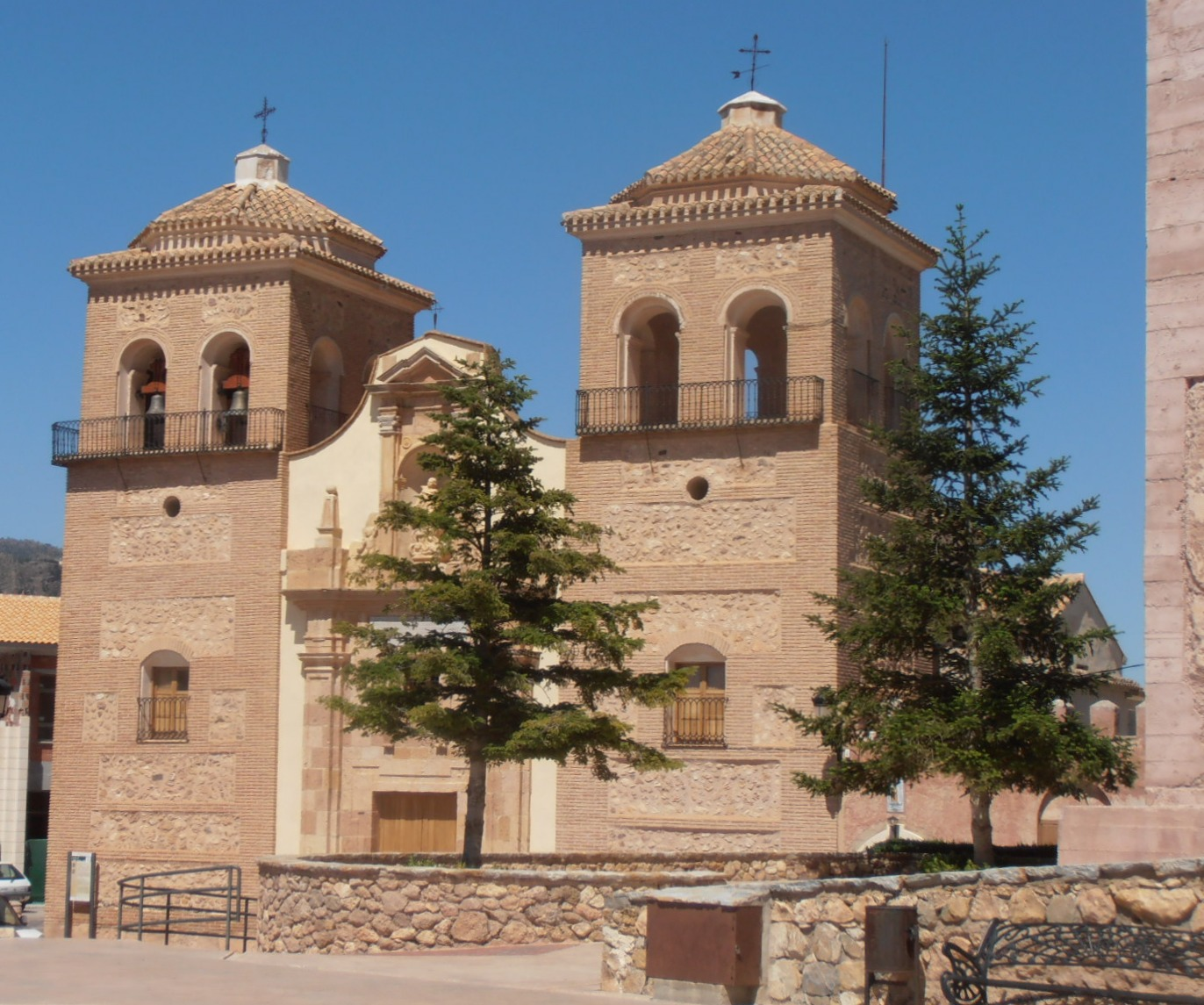
Aledo Santa Maria Church

== Geography ==
=== Physical geography ===
The municipality is part of the comarca (region) Bajo Guadalentín. It is enclosed by the municipality of Lorca but its west, which makes the border with Lorca. Aledo is located on the south slope of the mountain range Sierra Espuña.

=== Human geography ===
There were 1022 inhabitants registered in Aledo. They are distributed in the following localities: Aledo, which is located in the east end of the municipality and has a population of 893; Las Canales, which is placed in the northeastern quarter and is inhabited by 60 people; Montysol, which is located in the northeast and is inhabited by 45 people; Nonihay, which occurs in the southeastern quarter and has a population of 22; Patalache, which is located in the east and is home to 5 people and Los Allozos, which is placed in the south and occupied by 4 people.

== Demographics ==
6.75% inhabitants are foreigners – 5.28% are from other countries of Europe, 0.39% are Africans, 0.978% are Americans and one person from Asia also resides in the municipality. The table below shows the population trends during the 19th and 20th centuries by the beginning of their decades.

	1900	1910	1920	1930	1940	1950	1960	1970	1981	1991	2001	2011
Population	973	958	1,335	1,233	1,297	1,384	1,237	1,067	1,081	985	1,017	1,044

== Economy ==
97.9% territory is utilised as crop lands. The most widely grown products are the grapes, the almonds, and the lettuces. 45.95% agreements were written for jobs of the agriculture and fishing sector and 51.17% agreements were written for jobs of the service sector in 2019.

== Main sights ==
- Santa María la Real Church: The building was at first a mosque, in the Muslim Iberian Paeninsula era. It became a Christian temple in the year 1257.
- Castle of Aledo: This castle encloses Aledo village. It was built in the 11th century. The most remarkable part of this building structure is the Homenaje Tower.
- Homenaje Tower: It is part and the most remarkable one of the Castle of Aledo. The tower is also the emblem of the municipality.
- Pillory: This structure was built in the last 16th century.
- Official paths: There are five paths registered by the local government that traverse the municipality or can be found near it.

== Festivities ==
- Patron Saint Festivities: It is consecrated to saint María la Real and Augustine of Hippo. This festivity has themed days such as the crowning day, Corpus Christi octave, the Carriage day, Patron Saint Day. During these days several activities are carried out such as processions (festive religious parades), verbenas, cabezudos parades.
- Mark the Evangelist festivity: This festivity is held on 25 April. During the day, locals place the jirillos, small sized cloth effigies which have funny and ridiculous intentions/aims. People also go to the country and eat ‘gornazos’, typical small sized cakes.
- Neighbourhood festivity: It is held on 14 August.
- Crew meeting: This event usually takes place on the third Sunday of January.

== See also ==
- List of municipalities in the Region of Murcia
