= Albudeite =

- Municipality
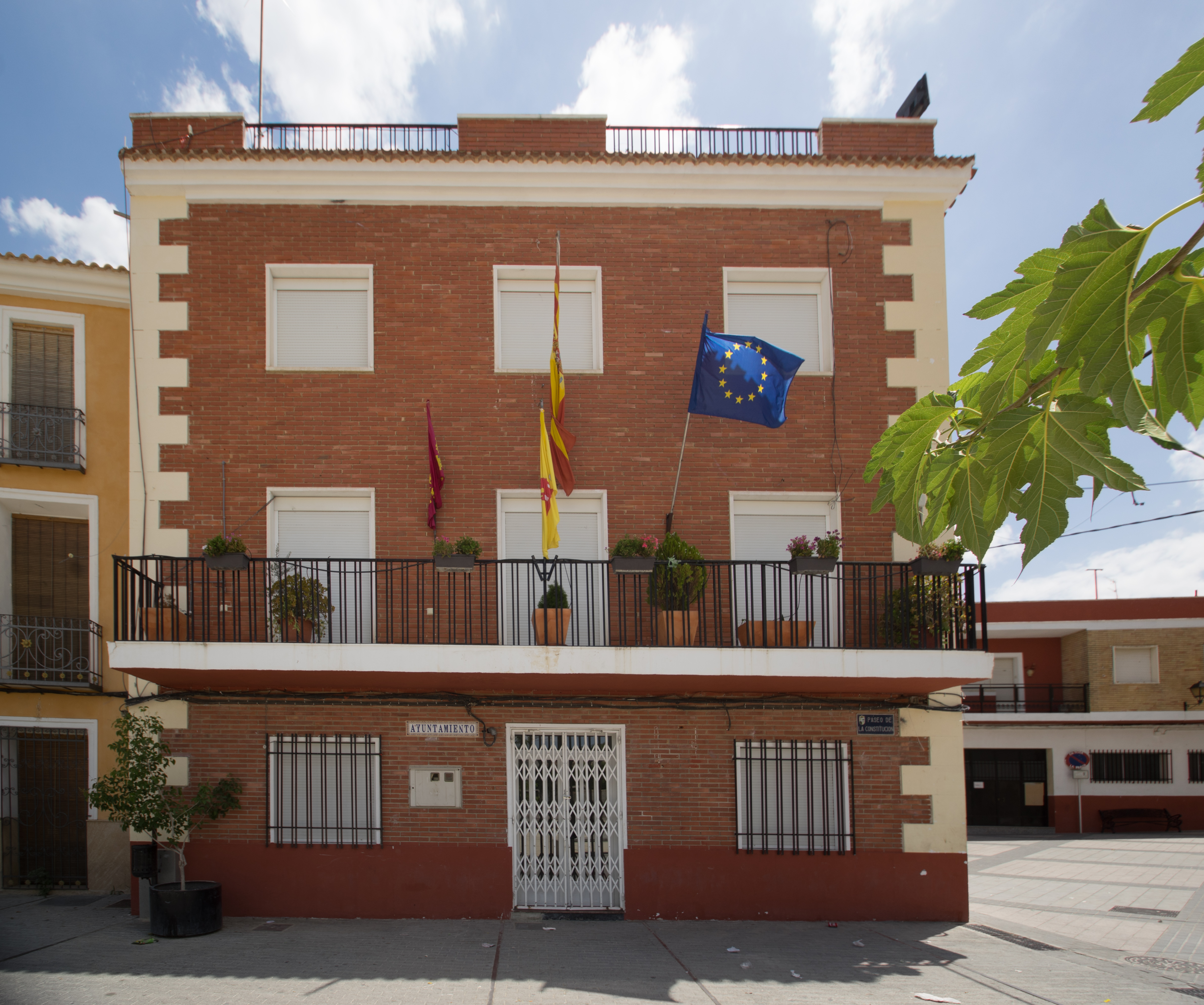
- Town hall

- Flag Coat of arms

- Location in Murcia

- Location in Murcia Location in Spain
- Country: Spain
- Autonomous community: Murcia
- Province: Murcia
- Comarca: Río Mula
- Judicial district: Mula

Government
  - Mayor: Jesus Garcia Martinez

Area
  - Total: 17.02 km^{2} (6.57 sq mi)
- Elevation: 181 m (594 ft)

Population (2025-01-01)
  - Total: 1,395
  - Density: 81.96/km^{2} (212.3/sq mi)
- Demonym: Albuiteros
- Website: Official website

Albudeite is a municipality in the Region of Murcia, Spain.

== Twin towns ==
- Saint-Geniès-de-Fontedit, France

== See also ==
- List of municipalities in the Region of Murcia
