= Cehegín =

- Municipality
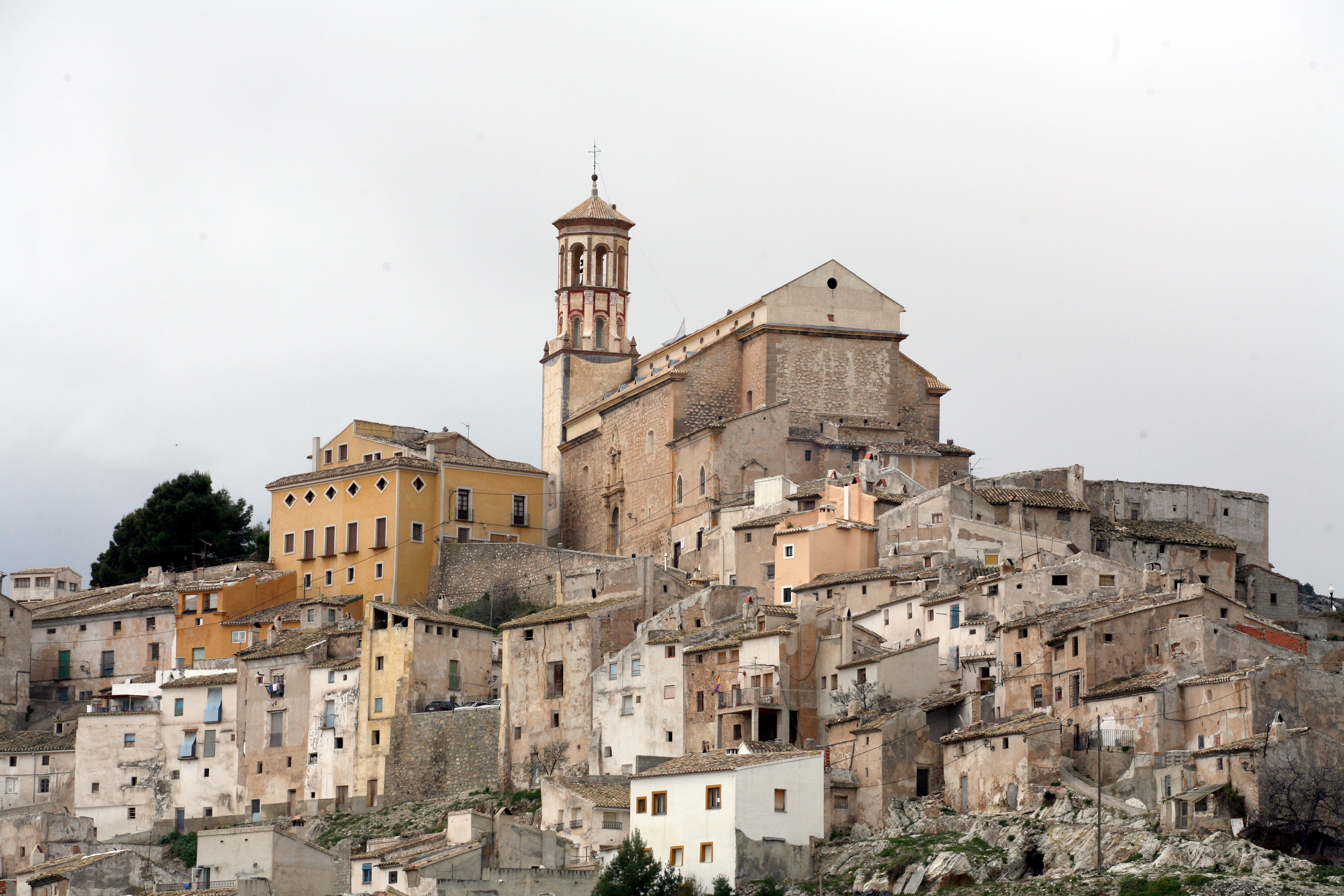

- Flag Coat of arms

- Location in Murcia Location in Spain
- Country: Spain
- Autonomous Community: Murcia
- Comarca: Comarca del Noroeste
- Towns (pedanias): List: Agua Salada; Algezares; Arroyo Hurtado; Burete; El Cabezo; Chaparral; El Campillo de los Jiménez; El Cortijo De Los Guapos; Canara; Cañada de Canara; Cehegín; La Carrasquilla; El Escobar; Gilico; La Pilá; El Ribazo; Valentín; Valdespino; La Casa Alta; La Vereda Arjona

Government
  - Type: Mayor-council government
  - Body: Ayuntamiento de Cehegín
  - Mayor: José Rafael Rocamora Gabarrón (2015) (PSRM-PSOE)

Area
  - Total: 292.7 km^{2} (113.0 sq mi)
- Elevation: 570 m (1,870 ft)

Population (2025-01-01)
  - Total: 14,506
  - Density: 49.56/km^{2} (128.4/sq mi)
- Demonym(s): Ceheginero, -ra (es)
- Time zone: CET (GMT +1)
  - Summer (DST): CEST (GMT +2)
- Postcode: 30430
- Website: Official website

Cehegín (Spanish: [θe(e)ˈxin]) is a town and municipality in the Comarca del Noroeste of the autonomous community of the Region of Murcia, Spain, situated some 66 km from the city of Murcia. It has a population of approximately 16,248 with 8227 males and 8021 females. It is crossed by the rivers Argos and Quipar.

== Agriculture & Business ==
The area has traditionally been an important source of marble, particularly red marble, which is exported as far afield as Japan and Argentina. Agriculture has also been important, with apricot and peach grown on irrigated soils, and olive, almond and vines grown on the drier land. Recent years have seen an increase in the cultivation of flowers under plastic poly-tunnels. Much of the local produce is pulped into fruit juices in canning facilities in the town. Local businesses include lawyers' offices, bakeries and construction.

== History ==
The name Cehegín is sometimes connected by Spanish historians with that of the Zenaga, Senhaja or Senajeli, a North African tribe that invaded Spain in the 11th century. The whole of this territory is layer upon layer of all the various cultures that established themselves here, the first settlers going back to 2400 BC. Reconquered by Alfonso VI with 1,000 horsemen and 11,000 infantrymen, Cehegín is one vast hilltop monument.

Cave paintings at Peña Rubia, a few kilometers outside the town, attest to the area being settled during prehistoric times. The town of Begastri, now abandoned, was settled during the later Bronze Age and was an important town during the time that the region was occupied by the Romans and the Visigoths. With the arrival of the Moors, the town center shifted to its present location at Cehegín. Remains of the Moorish city walls can still be seen, for example at the Puerta de Caravaca. The archaeological museum can also be found in the old town, where the exhibition includes a small fragment of Attic red-figure pottery dated to the 4th century BC.

Many conquistadors returned from South America with their riches and built large manorial houses in the old town. The old town has been revitalised recently by an influx of foreign (mainly British) buyers, who have renovated many of the older properties that were falling into disrepair.

Before it was given the name Cehegín, the town was called Bigastro (not to be confused with the district of Bigastro in the Valencian Community) and began to be an episcopal see when the bishop of Cartagena fled there after the Visigothic king Suintila (c. 588 – 633/635) destroyed that city. It remained a bishopric until Bigastro in its turn was destroyed by Arabs at the end of the 7th century. No longer a residential diocese, Bigastro is today listed by the Catholic Church as a titular see.

The pilgrimage town of Caravaca de la Cruz is located about 5 minutes west of Cehegín. Access to the town from Murcia was much improved by the construction of the C415 motorway in the late 1990s.

== Geography ==
=== Physical geography ===
Quípar River traverses the municipality from the west to the northeast. Other remarkable landforms are three mountain ranges, which are located in the southern half.

=== Human geography ===
The municipality hosts the following localities:

- the main town, which is located in the west and has a population of 12,888
- Canara, which is in the north-western quarter and is inhabited by 561
- Campillo y Suertes, where 224 people live
- Valentín, which is placed in the north end and is home to 377 people
- Cañara de Canara, which is located in the northern half and is home to 182 people
- Chaparral, which is placed in the eastern half and is inhabited by 170 people
- Campillo de Los Jiménez, which occurs in the northern half and is home to 163 people
- Carrasquilla, which is located in the northern half and has a population of 114
- El Escobar, which occurs in the south of the northern half and is home to 88 people
- Ribazo, which is placed in the south of the northern half and has a population of 81
- Burete, which is located in the southern half and is inhabited by 8 people
- Gilico, which is placed in the north-west and is inhabited by 1 person.

== Governing Cabinet ==
Members of the governing cabinet include

- José Rafael Rocamora Gabarrón: President
- Maravillas Fernández García: First Deputy Mayor and Councillor of Town planning, Industry, Financial Promotion, Patrimony and Hiring.
- Ismael Avellán García: Second Deputy Mayor and Councillor of Communication, Tourism, Youth Association, Celebrations and New Technologies.
- Joaquín López Carreño: Third Deputy Mayor and Councillor of Public Safety and Environment.
- Ana María Molina López: Fourth Deputy Mayor and Councillor of Social Services, Staff and Internal Rules.
- Francisco Chico Molina: Fifth Deputy Mayor and Councillor of Education and Culture.
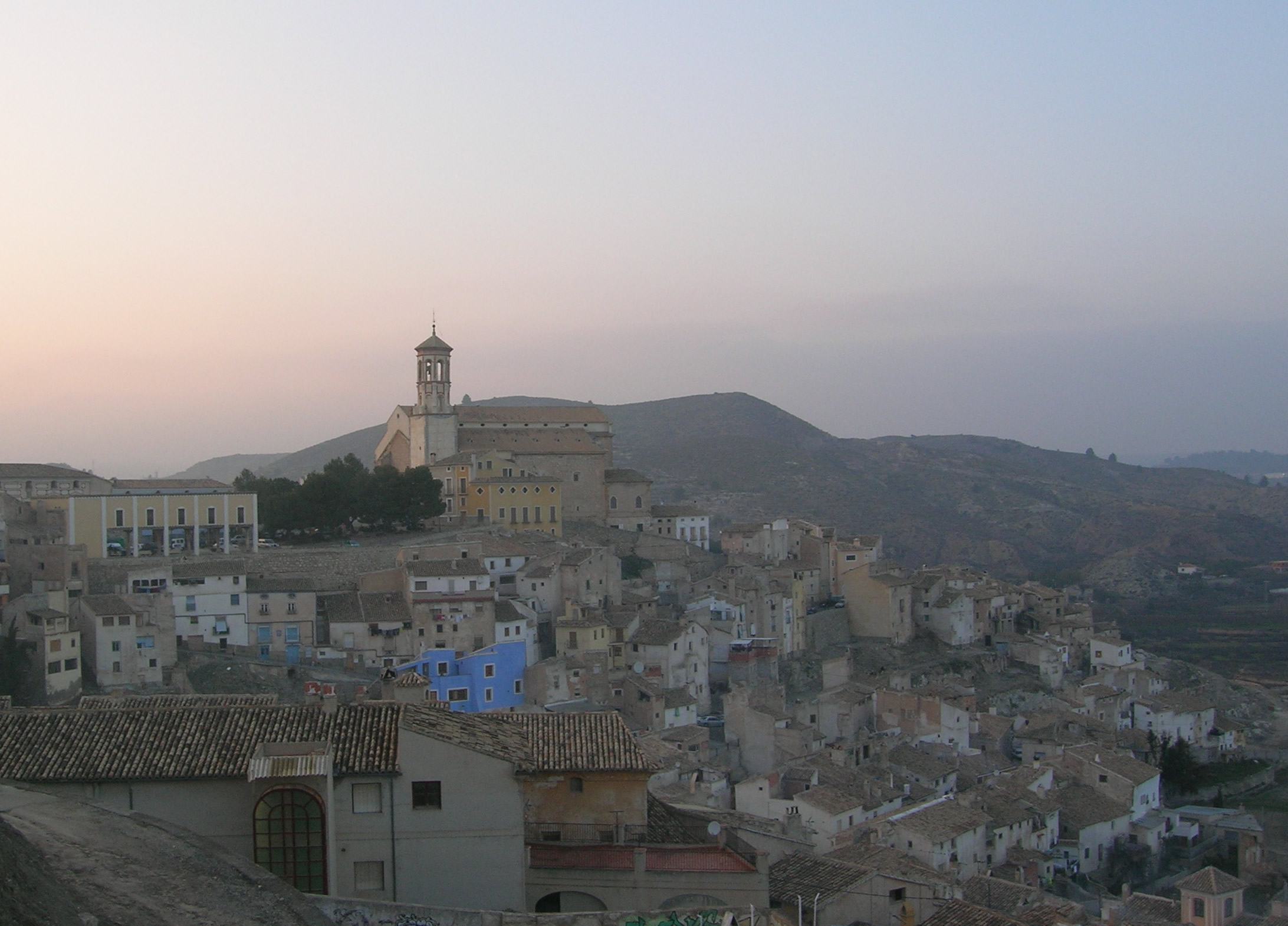
Church of santa María Magdalena and old quarter

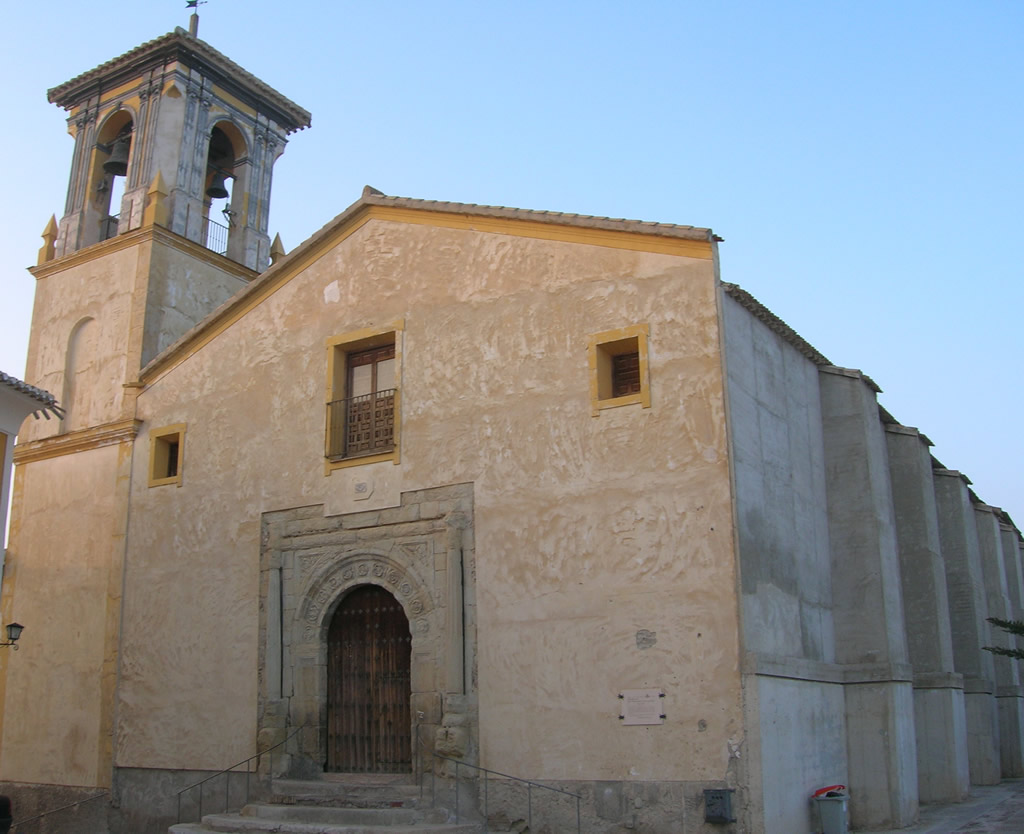
Hermitage of the Purísima Concepción (16th century)

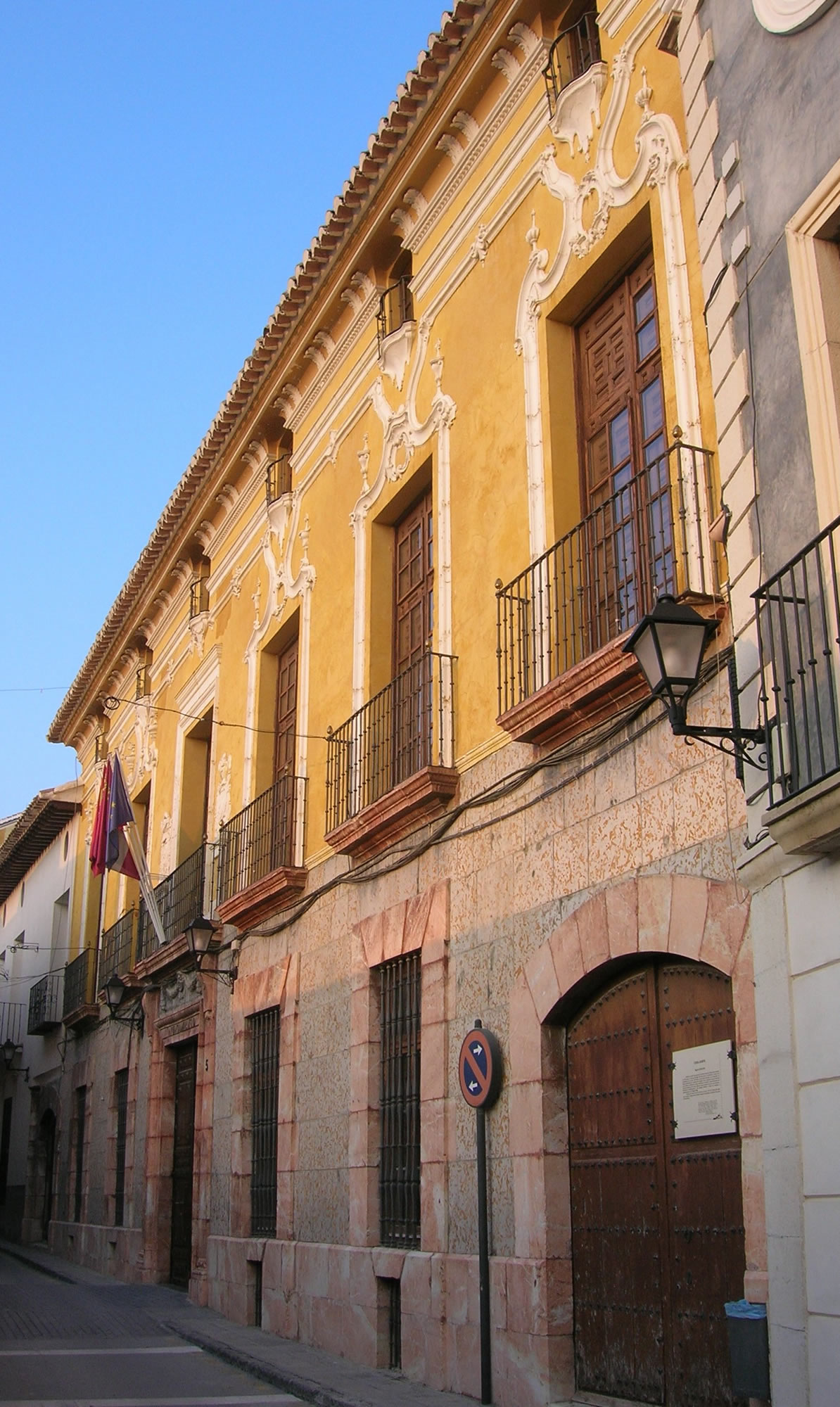
Casa Jaspe, 18th-19th century, at present the Town Hall

== Demographics ==
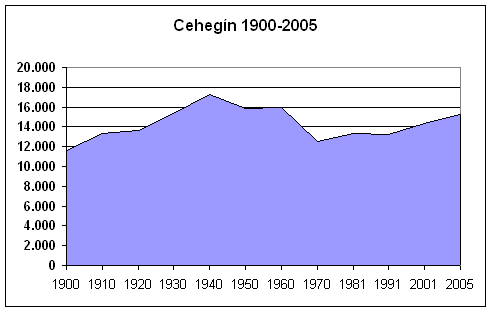
Evolution of the population of Cehegin throughout the 20th century

Like most towns in the region, Cehegín experienced a big demographic increase until 1940. Right after that there was a notable decline in the 1940s and 1960s, followed by a phase of stability. The current trend is clear growth, but the number of cehegineros who emigrate to other countries is still high.

In the district of Valentín (546 inhabitants) an important socio-economic change has taken place with the strong boom experienced by the semi-handicraft industry of clay pottery, destined mainly for export.

Evolution of Cehegín's Population Throughout the 20th Century
1857	1887	1900	1910	1920	1930	1940	1950	1960	1970	1981	1991	2001	2007	2009	2010	2011	2012	2014
8.710	10.417	11.601	13.313	13.684	15.403	17.316	15.830	15.928	12.489	13.365	13.271	14.383	15.798	16.235	16.299	16.286	16.267	15.955

== Economy ==
In the 1950s, still in postwar period, one of the most important activities of the town consisted in the cultivation and work of hemp to make handmade footwear, known as "alpargatas" in local slang.

In agriculture, the olive, almond and vineyard have predominated in the dry land, and apricot and peach in irrigation; what allowed from the decade of the 1970s to consolidate a strong industrial fabric manufacturing canner. Some of the most important factories of the time were: Los Isidros, Los Hernández, La Verja or Cofrutos (the latter is still in full operation). This sector gave way in later years to the boom of the marble industry since the town had marble quarries (mainly red marble limestone). This made it possible to strategically place different treatment plants for the mineral, which has been an important engine of development for the local economy for years, although in recent years the economic crisis of 2007 has forced to reduce and drastically modify the templates of these plants.

Cehegín also has a large area of mountains, with the Aleppo pine as the main tree.

In the hamlet of Canara, right next to Cehegín, there has been a great increase in the cultivation of flowers under greenhouse, mainly carnation, gladiolus and chrysanthemum.

=== Mercadillos (street markets) ===
- On the last Sunday of each month, the Plaza del Castillo hosts the El Mesoncico craft market, where more than fifty artisans from the area come together to offer their products, sausages, ceramics, sweets, soaps, wines, cheeses, etc.
- Also, the second-hand market and antiquities are held in the odd months, which takes place on the plains of the old Cehegín Train Station.

== Facilities ==
=== Healthcare ===
There is a consultorio (primary care centre with the fewest functions) in Campillo de Los Jímenez, another one in El Cañaral, another one in Cañada de Canara, and another one in Canara.

=== Education ===
The main town hosts 4 public early childhood and primary education centres (CEIP), two public secondary education centres (IES) and a centre for adult education (CEA).

== Historical-artistic patrimony ==
- Church of Santa María Magdalena :

Crowning the Plaza de la Constitución, a location within the old town of Cehegín, is the Church of the Magdalena, a work attributed to Jerónimo Quijano . It is located within the ceheginero religious patrimony and the most characteristic, since it is the one that draws the silhouette of this town. His works began in the sixteenth century and ended unfinished until the end of the seventeenth century.

It was declared a cultural interest with a monument category by Royal Decree on July 2, 1982; It is also declared a National Monument.

- Church of Solitude :

The Church of La Soledad is a temple with a basilical plan. Located on the hill on which the old town of Cehegín is developed, and specifically on the west side, on the course of the Argos River. It is part of the perspective of the historical set of Cehegín, in the panoramic view from the road that joins this town with Caravaca de la Cruz.

Building of the late sixteenth and early seventeenth century, renovated in the eighteenth, composed of different areas between which we can distinguish the temple itself, the bell tower, the dressing room of the Virgin and the santero house.

== Filmography ==
In the summer of 2013 the film "Ambel: La Película" was filmed in this town, directed by ceheginero José María López Oñate, 4th year student of Audiovisual Communication. Account, also, with Elvira Avilés in production direction, Antonio Guillén in post-production direction and Antonio José Ruiz Alguacil, scriptwriter and head of the acting direction.

The idea of making this feature comes from a group of university friends. It tells the story of Martin de Ambel and Bernad, whom, for killing the Alférez Mayor de la Villa, Don Alonso de Góngora in a duel, is imprisoned. After spending two years locked up in Granada, Martín is granted to return to Cehegín, with the condition that Martín de Ambel can not leave the Ermita de la Concepción. During the 38 years he spends there, not a single day will go by without the suffering and nightmares that his act will entail. "Ambel is a story of honor and blood.''

This film was budgeted for 400,000 euros, however, it has managed to shoot for 28,000 euros budget thanks to the help and selfless work of many people, as well as financial support through crowdfunding, merchandising, and contributions from the town hall.

== Festivities ==
The festivities that are held in the municipality are listed below:

- Carnival
- Holy week
- Patron saint festivity
- Festivity in Canara

== See also ==
- List of municipalities in the Region of Murcia
