= Bullas =

- Municipality
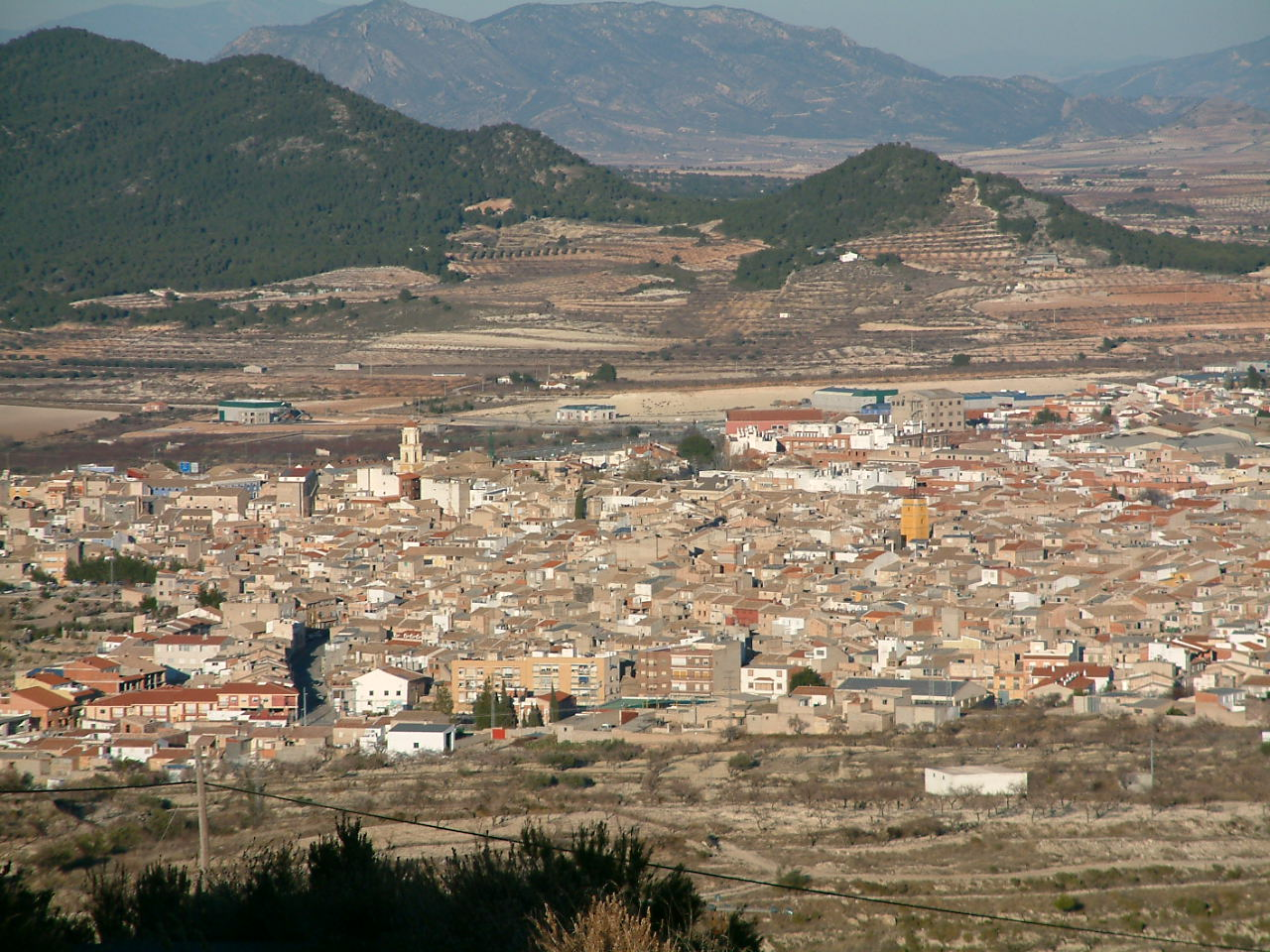

- Flag

- Location in Murcia

- Location in Murcia Location in Spain
- Country: Spain
- Autonomous community: Region of Murcia
- Comarca: Noroeste
- Judicial district: Mula

Government
  - Mayor: María Dolores Muñoz Valverde (PSOE)

Area
  - Total: 82.2 km^{2} (31.7 sq mi)
- Elevation: 650 m (2,130 ft)

Population (2025-01-01)
  - Total: 12,027
  - Density: 142/km^{2} (370/sq mi)
- Demonym: Bullenses or Bulleros
- Time zone: UTC+1 (CET)
  - Summer (DST): UTC+2 (CEST)
- Postal code: 30180
- Website: Official website

Bullas (Note: Pronunciation of Bullas: Spanish: [ˈbuʎas], locally [ˈbuʎæ]) is a town and municipality in the Region of Murcia, southeast Spain, located 53 km from the regional capital, Murcia. it is the highest municipality in the Region of Murcia after Moratalla.

The surrounding area is noted for the production of wine.

== Geography ==
The River Mula traverses the municipality from west to east. Part of two streams occur in the northwestern quarter from south to north. There are also two streams and two ramblas (usually dry water beds with water course during rainy periods) in the southern half of the municipality.

== Economy ==
57.7% of the territory is used for land crops. The most widely grown product by far is almonds although apricots, olives and grapes are also widely grown. 13.94% agreements were written for jobs in the agriculture sector in 2019 and 18.24% workers were hired as agriculture labourers in the first half of 2016. 36.02% agreements were written for jobs in the industry sector and 41.43% workers were hired as fabrication labourers.

== Facilities ==
=== Healthcare ===
There is a consultorio (primary care centre with the fewest functions) and a centro de salud (primary care centre).

=== Education ===
The main town hosts two early childhood and primary education centres (CEIP) and one secondary education centre (IES). Another early childhood and primary education centre can also be found in La Copa.

== Twin towns ==
- (Spain) La Vila Joiosa / Villajoyosa, from 1999
- (Netherlands) Groesbeek, from 2012
- (Italy) Bosa, from 2013

== See also ==
- Castle of Bullas
- List of municipalities in the Region of Murcia
