= Campos del Río =

- Municipality
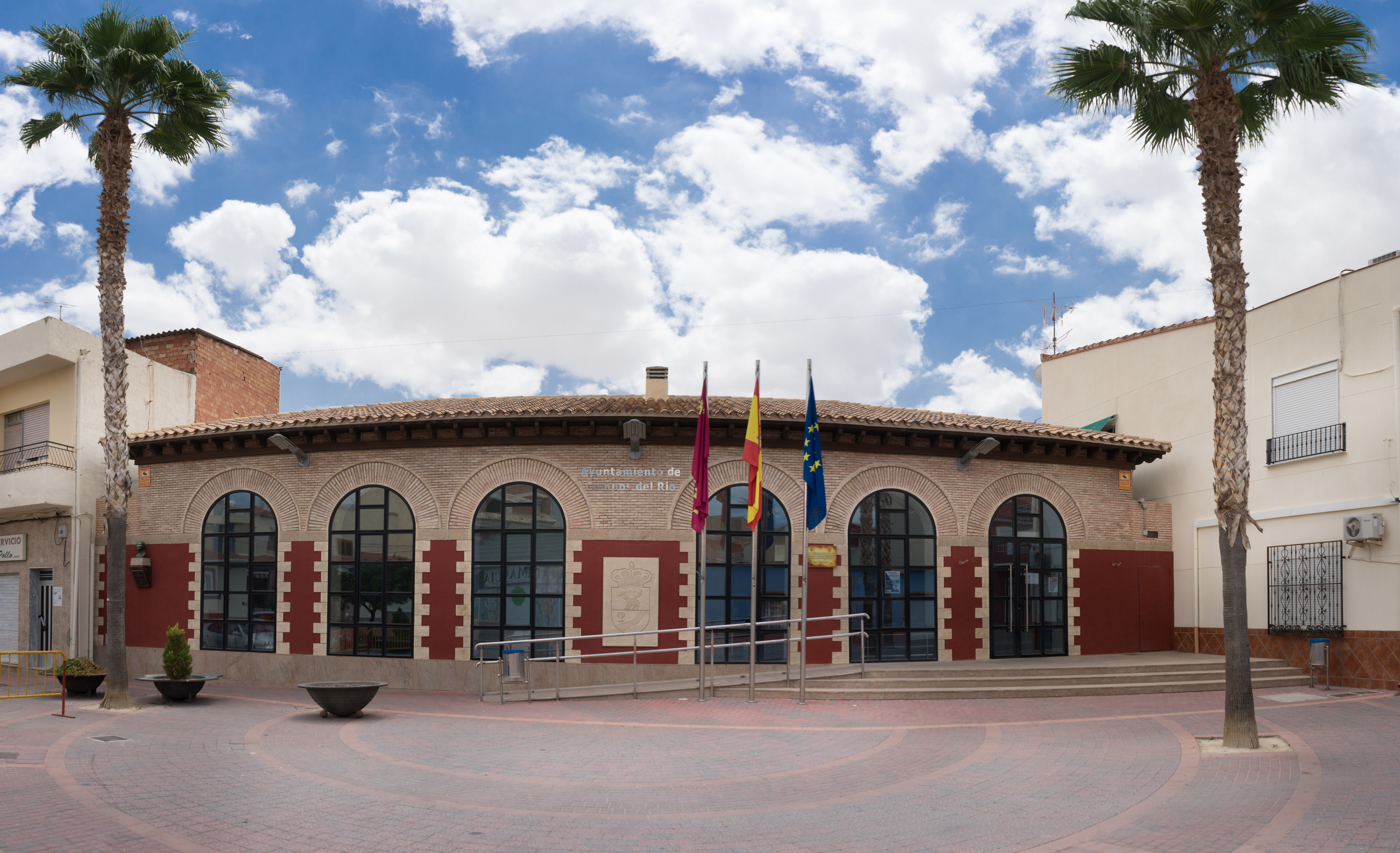

- Coat of arms

- Location in Murcia

- Location in Murcia Location in Spain
- Country: Spain
- Autonomous community: Murcia
- Province: Murcia
- Comarca: Río Mulal

Government
  - Mayor: Miguel Buendía

Area
  - Total: 47.29 km^{2} (18.26 sq mi)
- Elevation: 172 m (564 ft)

Population (2025-01-01)
  - Total: 2,159
  - Density: 45.65/km^{2} (118.2/sq mi)
- Time zone: UTC+1 (CET)
  - Summer (DST): UTC+2 (CEST)
- Website: Official website

Campos del Río is a municipality in the autonomous region of Murcia in southeastern Spain. It covers an area of 47.3 km^{2} and shares borders with Ojós at its north, Villanueva del Río Segura and Alguazas at its north-east, Las Torres de Cotillas at its east, Murcia at its south-east, Mula and Albudeite at its south and west and Ricote at its north-west.

== Demography ==
6.26% of the inhabitants are foreigners – 3.79% are Africans, 1.38% are Americans and 0.936% are Asians. The table below shows the population trend by decades of the 20th and 21st centuries.

	1900	1910	1920	1930	1940	1950	1960	1970	1981	1991	2001	2011
Population	1,517	1,690	1,743	1,942	1,971	2,274	2,222	2,021	2,046	1,949	2,046	2,201

== Economy ==
27.7% of the territory was used for crop purposes in 2019, the most widely grown products are the almonds, and 44.46% of the agreements were signed by workers of the agriculture sector.

== See also ==
- List of municipalities in the Region of Murcia
