= Tiata =

- Hamlet
- Location within Spain
- Coordinates: 37°39′59.33″N 1°41′17.94″W
- Country: Spain
- Province: Murcia
- Municipality: Lorca

Population (2023)
  - Total: 772
- Post code: 30818

Tiata was a village in Murcia, Spain and is now an eastern hamlet in the city of Lorca. It is part of the municipality of Lorca. Tiata is located adjacent to the hamlets of Sutullena, Campillo and Torrecilla.

It is located on the banks of the Rego de Porlǎn. According to local folklore, it was in this area known as "Los Reales" de Lorca where King Fernando III, King of Castilla y León and his son, Prince Alfonso X, camped his Christian armies to carry out the conquest of the Muslim stronghold of Lorca in 1244.

The Santuario Nuestra Señora la Real de las Huertas (Convent and Sanctuary of the Virgen de las Huertas), an 18th-century Fransciscan convent and church is located in Tiata.
