= Coy, Spain =

Coordinates: 37°57′N 1°48′W

Coy
- Interactive map of Coy
- Country: Spain
- A. community: Murcia
- Province: Murcia
- Comarca: Alto Guadalentín

Area
  - Total: 27.627 km^{2} (10.667 sq mi)
- Elevation: 859 m (2,818 ft)

Population (2005)
  - Total: 513
  - Density: 22.38/km^{2} (58.0/sq mi)

Coy is a town within the municipality of Lorca, in the Spanish province of Murcia. It has a population of 511 and is located 22 miles north of Lorca. Previously known for their supply of metals, they are now known for their wine and traditional crafts.

== Location ==
The town is located in the slope of the Peak of Coy, mainly in the south of the "Saw of the Lavia", along the mouth of a south-west water spring. At its basin begins a plateau (Plateau of Coy) with boulevards that remain dry the whole year. From this forms the mouth of the Turrilla River (tributary of the Guadalentin).

== Climate ==
The plateau of Coy has similar climates to those found in the Mediterranean Sea with cold winters, some years developing snow. The summers are warm during the day with soft temperatures in the evenings. There is little rainfall, most occurring either in spring or autumn with very soft climate remaining.

== Population ==
The population is concentrated in the center of Coy, with a whole of 512 persons as of the year 2005 with an occupation of 17.7 inhabitants per square kilometer. There is even distribution of male to female in the town of Coy.

Yearly Population
1950	1960	1970	1980	1990	2000	2005
782	767	683	516	503	506	512

== History ==
The word " Coy " derives from the Latin "collis", meaning a hill or hills. The English translation of the town name is Hammock. Coy is also most likely where the surname De Los Santos originated.

Coy has antiquitarial history. The town possesses a large quantity of archaeological remains, such as Cerro de Las Viñas (translated means The Hill of the Vineyards), a town from the Bronze Age of international interest. There is also the Fuentecica, an Iberian necropolis where a famous steel pillar was located called the León of Coy which now resides in the Archaeological Museum of Murcia. The Hamlet, a Roman town where a sculpture of the Roman god Mercury was held, was also part of Coy with the statue now residing in the Archaeological Museum of Lorca. With the Muslem faith so dominate in the region for a period, a Moor enclave from the Kingdom of Murcia devoted themselves to agriculture. Their castle controlled an extensive territory. After the Reconquista, it turned into a frontier territory with the Kingdom of Granada. Alfonso X of Castile made it a sister site to the city of Lorca. His castle and step was destroyed by the dominion of Sancho Manuel, son of Juan Manuel, Prince of Villena in the 14th century, similar to the dominion of the Riquelme. Coy was the third most important center of the municipality after Lorca and Port Louvres, going so far as building their own convent. Over time the lead and silver mines became exhausted and due to the lack of communication the town's once rich resource has since been forgotten.

Some homes are built on the hillside with narrow streets, slopes and alleys between. The Hill of The Vineyards (Town argárico) and the Church of San Jose of Coy (Baroque) play an important role to the town people.

== Economy ==
The economy is based on textile crafts with the manufacture of jarapas and carpets. In agriculture Coy has emphasis in vine farming, of which a handmade wine is produced. Almond trees, green coffee beans and other green products are also produced. There are several pig and chicken farms, as well as sheep cattle. Lately the flourishing rural tourism outlines the town's most prosperous future. The hostel Casa Grande (built in the 18th century) is a large draw, as is the artificial beach and the charm of many rural houses.
