= Ramonete =

Village in Murcia, Spain

- Interactive map of Ramonete
- Country: Spain
- Province: Murcia
- Municipality: Lorca

Population (2010)
  - Total: 1,346

Ramonete is a village in Murcia, Spain. It is part of the municipality of Lorca.
