= Sutullena =

- Hamlet
- Location within Spain
- Country: Spain
- Province: Murcia
- Municipality: Lorca

Population (2023)
  - Total: 4,673
- Post code: 30800

Sutullena was a village in Murcia, Spain and is now a southern hamlet in the city of Lorca. It is part of the municipality of Lorca. Sutullena is located adjacent to the hamlets of Tiata, Campillo and Torrecilla.

== Transport ==
The Lorca-Sutullena railway station is located in Sutullena, on the Cercanías Murcia/Alicante line. The station is located next to the Plaza de Carruajes and the Plaza de Toros.
