= Ortillo =

- Interactive map of Ortillo
- Country: Spain
- Province: Murcia
- Municipality: Lorca

Population
  - Total: 22

Ortillo is a village in the province of Murcia, Spain. It is part of the municipality of Lorca.
