= College of Saint Patrick =

Coordinates: 37°40′37″N 1°41′59″W

Collegiate Church of Saint Patrick
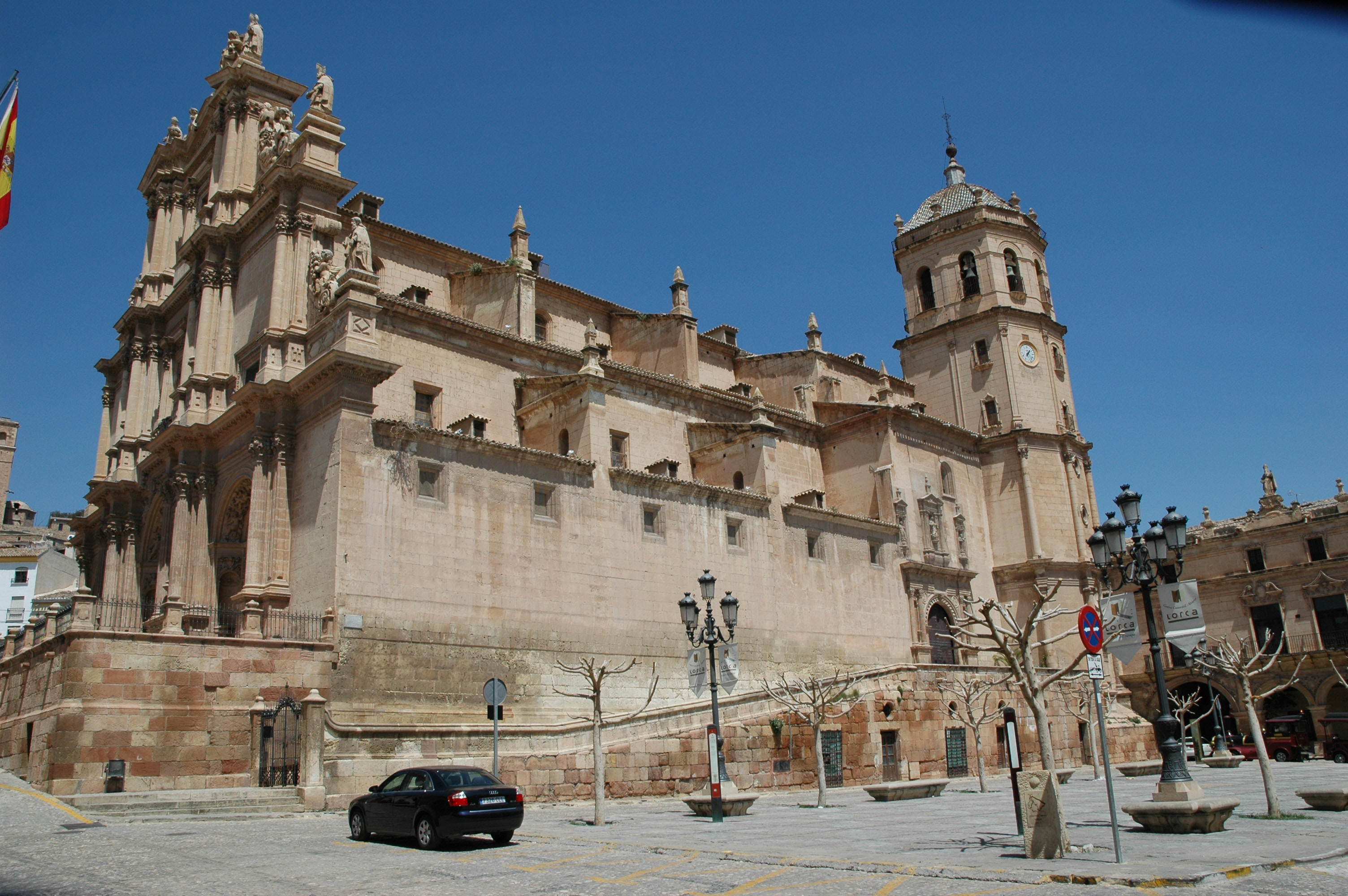
- View of the Collegiate Church from Plaza de España.
- Collegiate Church of Saint Patrick
- Location: Lorca
- Country: Spain
- Denomination: Catholic Church

Architecture
- Heritage designation: Saint Patrick
- Style: Renaissance, Baroque

Administration
- Diocese: Cartagena

The former Collegiate Church of Saint Patrick in Lorca (although it is still commonly referred to as such), is a Renaissance-style building declared a Historic-Artistic National Monument by decree on January 27, 1941.

The Collegiate Church is the cornerstone of the monumental complex of Plaza de España, along with the Town Hall of Lorca, the Palace of the Corregidor, and the chapter houses.

This is the most important church in Spain dedicated to Saint Patrick of Ireland, although it is not the only one, as is often mistakenly claimed. (Note: There are other churches in Spain dedicated to Saint Patrick, such as those in Málaga and Madrid.) The dedication to the Irish saint originates from the Battle of Los Alporchones, fought on March 17, 1452 (Saint Patrick's Day), which saw the citizens of Lorca and other parts of the former Kingdom of Murcia (Crown of Castile) battle Muslim forces from Granada, who had ravaged the Cartagena region.

Construction began in 1533 by Papal bull from Pope Clement VII, on the site of the old Church of Saint George. Despite numerous issues, it was completed in 1780 following the plans of Jerónimo Quijano, master builder for the Diocese of Cartagena. Designed with cathedral-like grandeur, its interior includes three naves, twelve side chapels between the buttresses, a choir and rear choir, ambulatory with radial chapels, and a bell tower at the apse. The large transept is also noteworthy.

== Design ==
Work on the Collegiate Church of Saint Patrick began in 1533 after the papal bull by Pope Clement VII over the old Church of Saint George. The author of the design remains unknown. While popular belief holds the plans came directly from Rome with the bull, comparisons with the Cathedral of Murcia suggest otherwise.

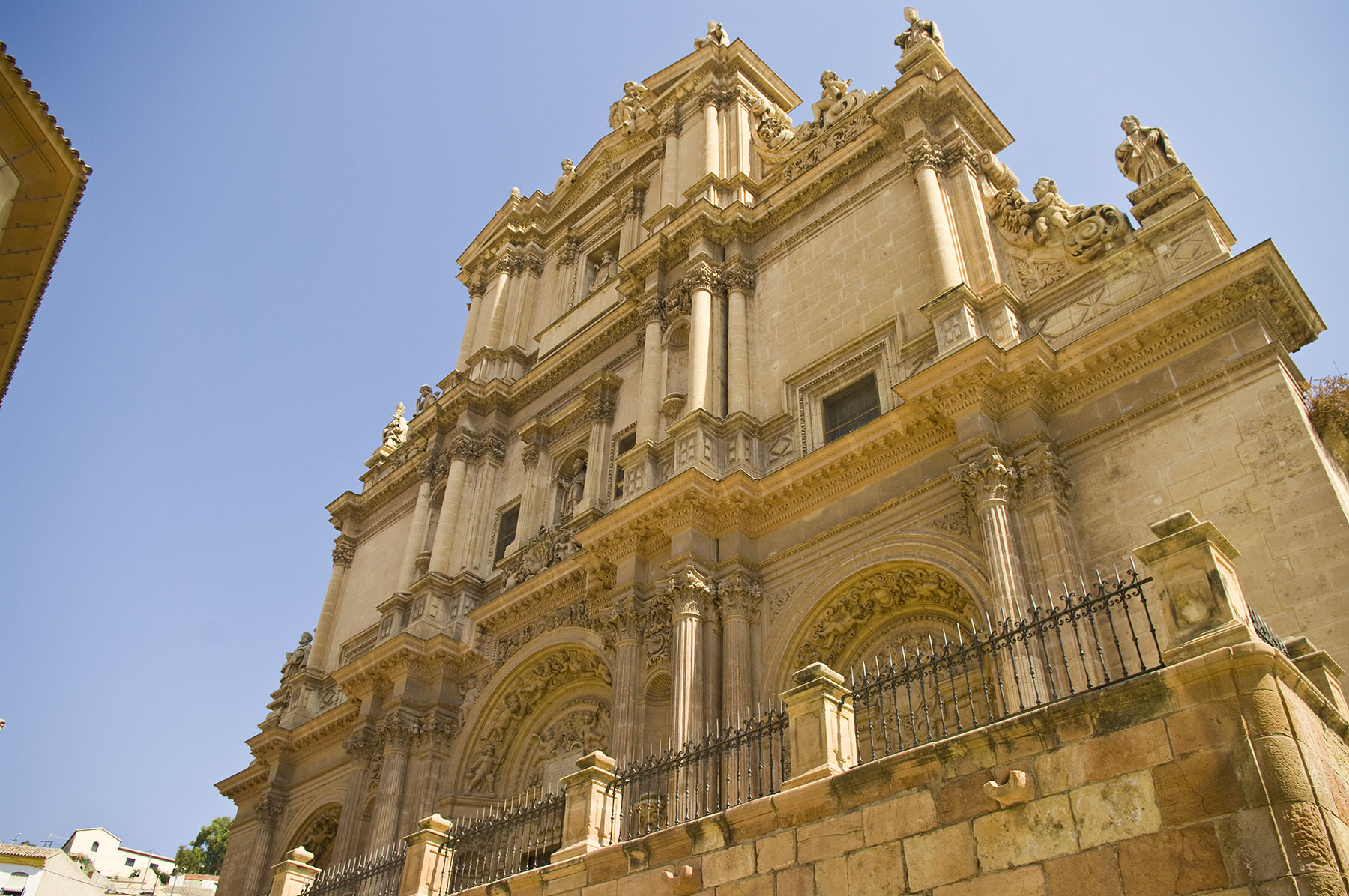
View of the monumental façade of Saint Patrick's

The project was largely driven by the local bourgeoisie, aiming to enhance the city's prestige. Given the similarities with the nearby cathedral, it is plausible that the architect was already working in southeastern Spain.

The floor plans of Saint Patrick's and the Murcia Cathedral are strikingly similar: three naves, the central being wider; side chapels between buttresses; radial chapels in the ambulatory; a bell tower housing the Sacristy; and a large transept.

Historian Joaquín Espín Rael identified Jerónimo Quijano as the architect, based on lost records from the Civil War. As Master Builder of the Cathedral of Murcia since 1526 and a prestigious architect, he likely received the commission. He was documented in Lorca through various public works commissioned by the local council.

== Construction ==
=== Stonemasons ===
Much of the Collegiate's archive was lost during the Civil War, destroying valuable historical documentation.

The first known stonemason was Master Lope, likely also the project supervisor. He was followed by the Basque brothers Domingo and Martín de Plasencia, local residents involved in other works in the city. Later contributors include Sebastián Bocanegra, Lorenzo Goenaga, Jerónimo de Urreta, and Diego de Villavona.

In the 17th century, work was continued by Andrés Goenaga, Garzón Soriano, Pérez Crespo, and Melchor de Luzón. In the 18th century, names like Ortiz de la Jara, Salvador and Diego de Mora, and Sánchez Fortún appear in connection with the church.

=== 16th century ===
The church's construction suffered continual delays, extending nearly 250 years instead of the planned eight.

Financial difficulties and legal disputes over burial rights slowed progress. Construction began at the Main Chapel and progressed to the apse and the tower's base, which houses the Sacristy. A second phase in 1553 saw the completion of the remaining chapels, parts of the transept, and the roof. The façade on the Epistle side and the first two tower sections were also completed.

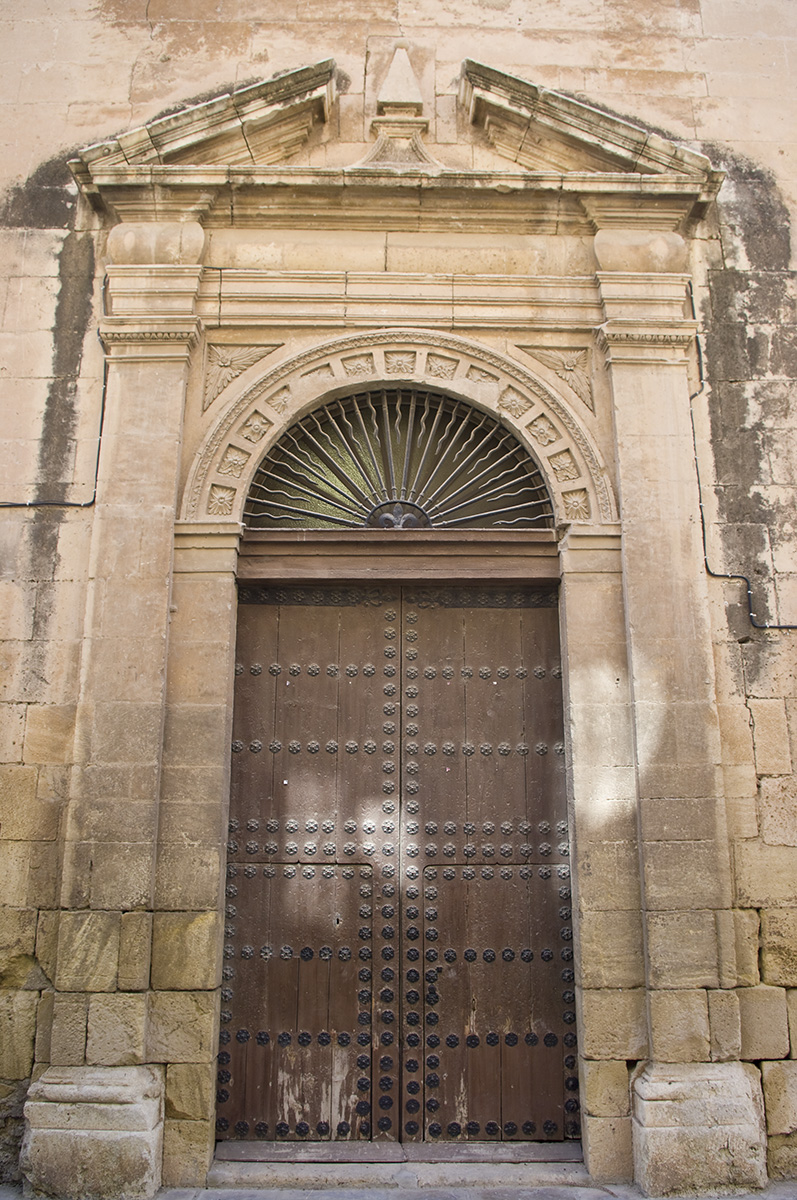
Renaissance portal on the Epistle side

Local stone was used, sourced from the river and Murviedro quarries.

Roofing alternates Gothic-style ribbed vaults (in the ambulatory and chapels) with Renaissance-style vaults in the Sacristy and Main Chapel, inspired by Andrés de Vandelvira, under whom Jerónimo Quijano had trained.

=== 17th century ===
The 17th century brought more delays and economic hardship.

Lorca faced a crisis, limiting council funds. Endemic water scarcity, bubonic plague outbreaks, and earthquakes added to the delays. Work was limited to perimeter walls.

Around 1640, carpenter Andrés García Ramos built the choir stalls: 29 high and 23 low seats.

In 1679, a plea to the Crown led to Charles II of Spain funding construction. In 1694, the monumental Baroque façade by architect José de Vallés began.

=== 18th century ===
Construction concluded in the 18th century, focusing on roofing the naves with intersecting brick vaults.

This phase also completed the flooring, choir walls, rear choir, the tower's final section, and the passage to the Gospel-side portal.

By the century's end, Saint Patrick's had reached its current appearance.

== Exterior ==
=== Main façade (Imafronte) ===
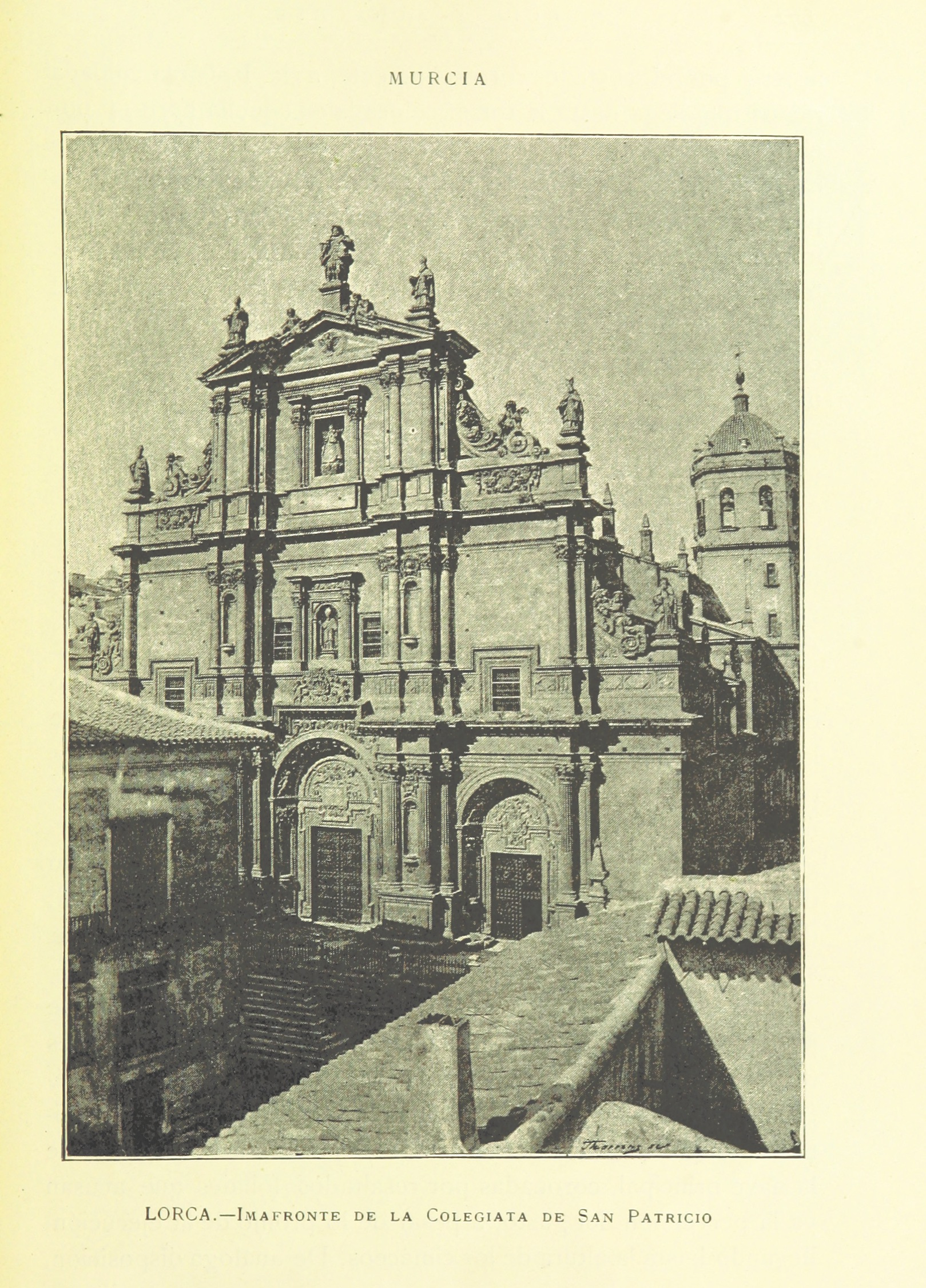
Main façade of the Collegiate Church in the 19th century

The main façade, built 1694–1704 by José de Vallés, is one of the church's highlights. Sculptors included Salvador and Diego de Mora, Félix Vallés, Martínez de la Vega, Manuel Caro, Agustín Pareja, and the Caballero brothers. Along with the Cathedral of Murcia and the Basilica of Vera Cruz in Caravaca, it is one of the three monumental Baroque façades in the Region of Murcia.

It blends Granadan and Valencian styles, with some seeing Jesuit influences in its upper stories.

A Baroque masterpiece, it includes classical elements like columns, niches, and pedestals, arranged in three tiers and five vertical sections, reflecting the church's interior.

==== First tier ====
Designed as a triumphal arch with five sections. The three central ones match the interior naves and contain the entrances. Decorated with Corinthian fluted columns on high pedestals, and detailed arches filled with cherubs and garlands—a rare motif in Spain.

==== Second tier ====
Three sections with statues and volutes. Columns are smooth and Composite order. The central niche contains a statue of Saint Patrick, flanked by windows.

==== Third tier ====
A single central niche holds a statue of the Virgin of Alcázar, ancient patron of Lorca. It ends in a split triangular pediment with the Holy Spirit as a phoenix, a sculpture of the Angel of Fame at the top, and reclining trumpet-blowing angels and saints on the sides.

=== Carrerón portal ===
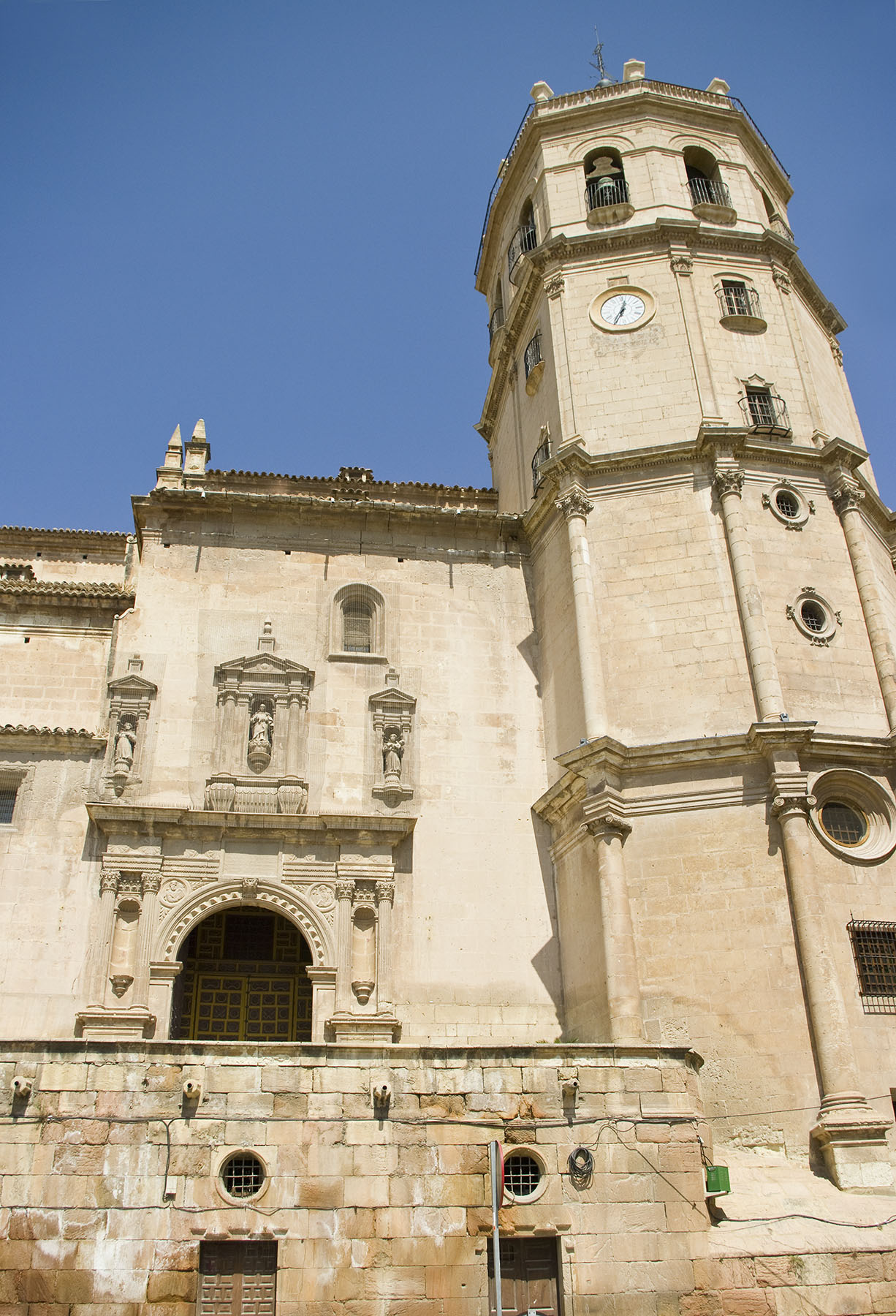
Portal and tower

The south entrance, built around 1571, was the main one for years. Two tiers: a triumphal arch flanked by Corinthian columns; the upper one has three niches with statues of the Virgin, Saint Francis of Assisi, and Saint Anthony of Padua.

=== Epistle side portal ===
Facing Abad de los Arcos street, it was carved by Lorenzo de Goenaga in the late 16th century. A Renaissance work inspired by Herrerian style, with a plain arch flanked by pilasters and a split pediment.

=== Bell tower ===
Four-tiered stone tower, with early sections by Jerónimo Quijano in the 16th century for the sacristy. The upper sections were added in 1761 by Fray Pedro de San Agustín.

Simple decoration with cornices separating tiers. Architectural orders from bottom to top: Ionic, Composite, pilasters, and finally the bell tower.

=== Chapter houses ===
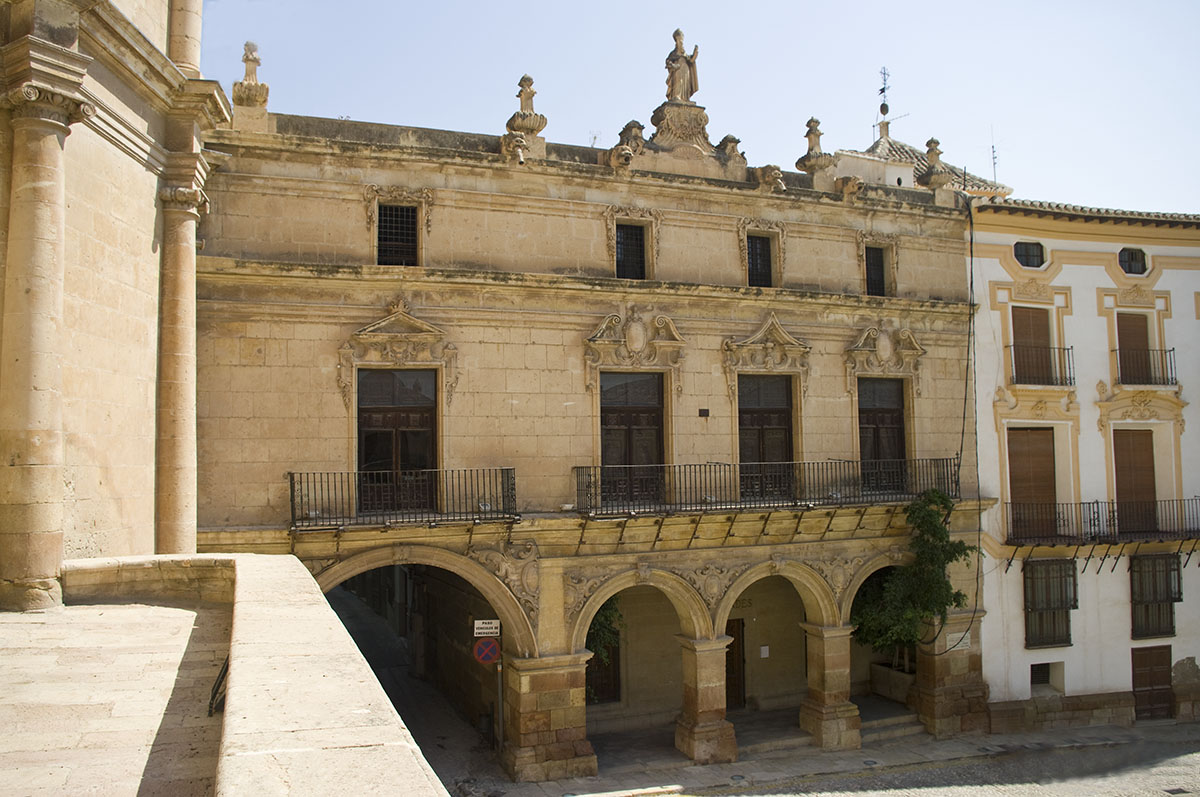
Chapter houses

Built in 1741 by Nicolás de Rueda; stonework by Pedro Bravo Morata and sculpture by Juan de Uzeta.

Three levels: arcades below (including one over Calle Cava), balconies in the middle, and rectangular windows above. Crowned with gargoyles, pinnacles, and a central statue of Saint Patrick.

== Bibliography ==
- Segado Bravo, Pedro (2006). The Collegiate Church of Saint Patrick in Lorca. Edit.um, University of Murcia. ISBN 978-84-8371-645-8.
- Sala Vallejo, Rosalía (1998). Lorca and its history. R. Sala Vallejo. ISBN 84-923615-0-6.
