= Doña Inés =

Coordinates: 37°56′N 1°50′W

- Interactive map of Doña Inés
- Country: Spain
- Province: Murcia
- Municipality: Lorca

Population (2010)
  - Total: 145

Doña Inés is a village in Murcia, Spain. It is part of the municipality of Lorca.
