= La Paca =

Coordinates: 37°52′N 1°50′W

- Interactive map of La Paca
- Country: Spain
- Province: Murcia
- Municipality: Lorca
- Elevation: 730 m (2,400 ft)

Population (2010)
  - Total: 1,318

La Paca is a village in Murcia, Spain. It is part of the municipality of Lorca.

An earthquake in 2005 heavily affected the village.
