= Zarzadilla de Totana =

Coordinates: 37°53′N 1°42′W

- Interactive map of Zarzadilla de Totana
- Country: Spain
- Province: Murcia
- Municipality: Lorca
- Elevation: 870 m (2,850 ft)

Population (2010)
  - Total: 491

Zarzadilla de Totana is a village in Murcia, Spain. It is part of the municipality of Lorca.
