= Archaeological Museum of Lorca =

Spanish Archaeology Museum

Coordinates: 37.6785°N 1.6966°W

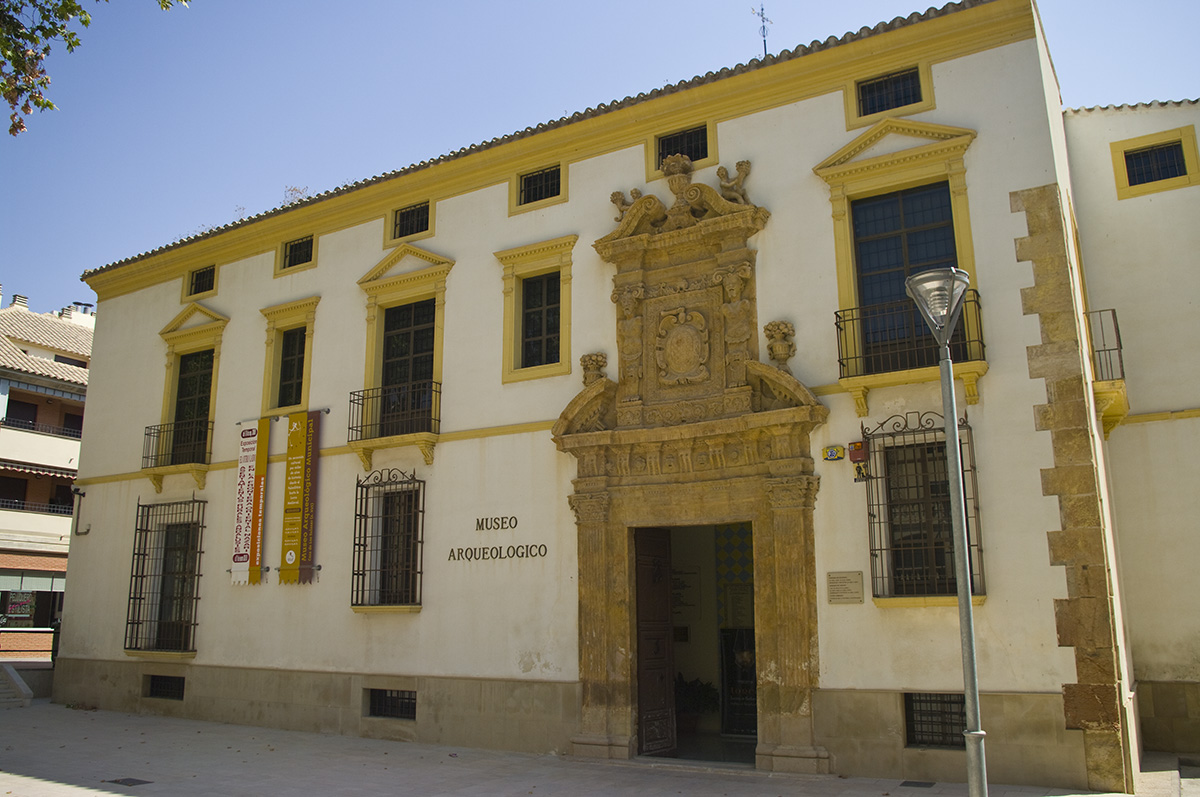
Archaeological Museum of Lorca

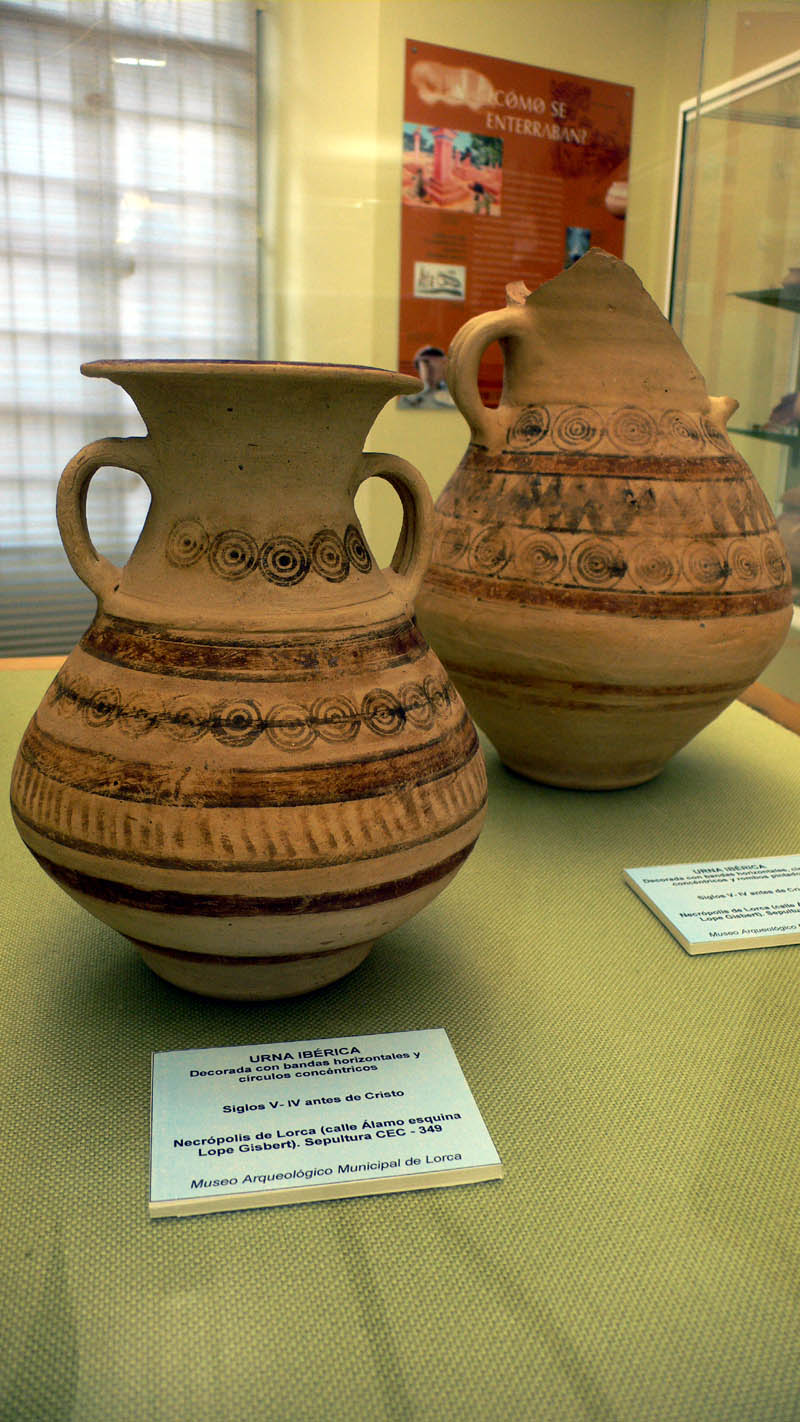

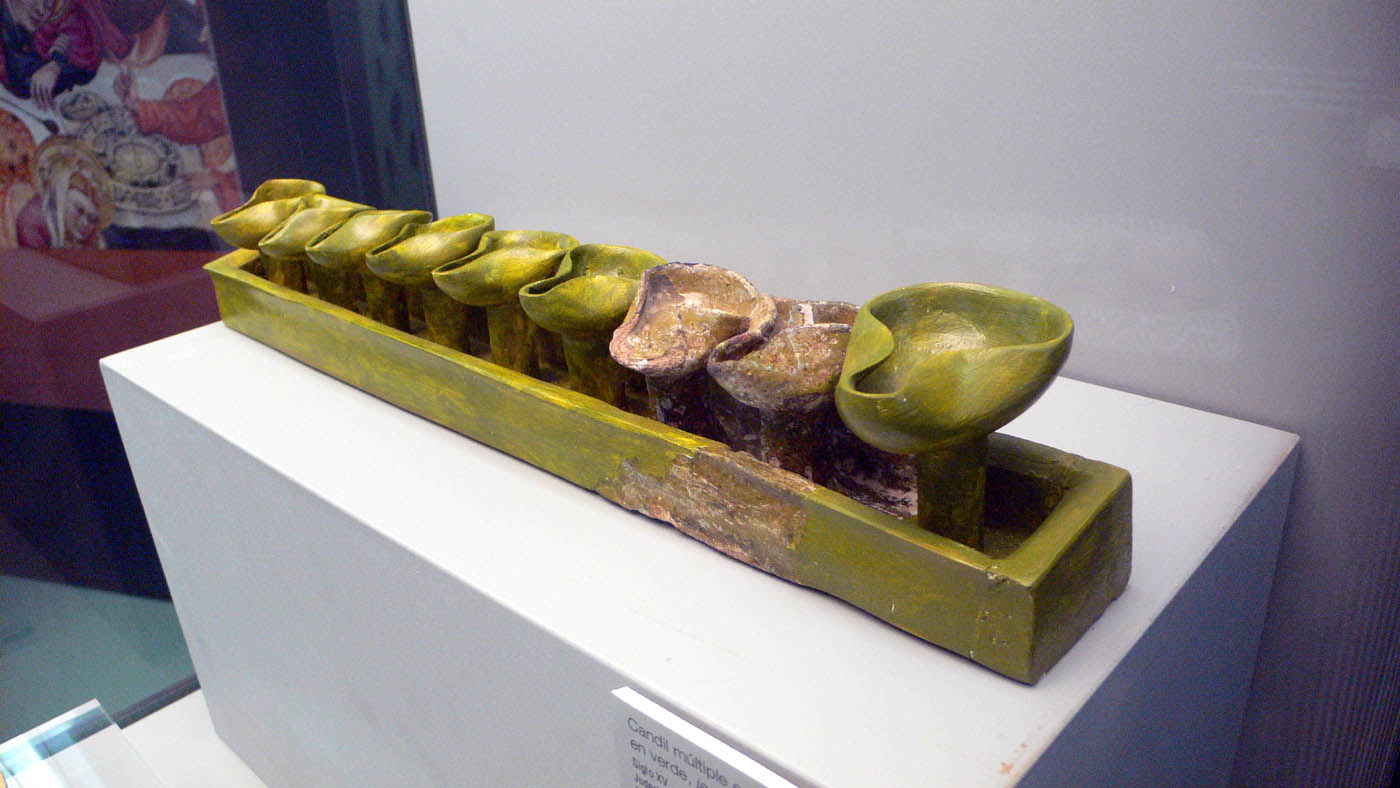
Medieval hanukiah from the excavations of the Jewish quarter of Lorca (Spain). S.XV.

The Archaeological Museum of Lorca (Museo Arqueológico de Lorca) is an archaeological museum in Lorca, Spain, located in the renovated "House of Salazar" which had been built in the early 17th century.

The museum is a store house of all the archaeological antiquaries found during excavations in several historical areas of Lorca and from other regions in Spain. Limestone statues made in the Lavant area of Lorca decorate the façade. These statues carved are of Mary Natareloo Salazar flanked by figures of two naked female torsos. Inside the museum exhibits are in several sections arranged in a sequence. In the lobby and the first section of the museum the exhibits are: Prehistoric Paleolithic (95000-32000 BC) and Chalcolithic period (32,000 to 9000 BC) finds seen in the flint section consist of antiquaries of scrapers, knives and points used by the hunters and gatherers who lived in Black Hill of Jofré and the Correia in Lorca; utensils arrowheads, axes, polished piece, handmade pottery, beads of people who lived in the region of Lorca during the late Neolithic period (3500 BC); the Copper Age (3000 BC) findings of funerary objects found in the caves of the hills in Lorca; stone architecture of the megaliths of the Black Hill in Lorca; the later part of the third millennium idols made from clay, bone and stone from the excavations from the Glorieta de San Vicente (Lorca city), one particular item of display is the triangular plate of stone painted in black with schematic rock art painting and other animal on the shoulder blade; the two columns of Emperor Augustus (8-7 BC) and Emperor Diocletian; and the Roman period mosaics, faces of Venus and the nine females of the period.

Exhibits in other sections of the museum display excavations from various regions of Lorca. These are: Chalcolithic burial funerary remains with many objects (carbon dated age of more than 4000 years), circular silo of the fag end period of the Neolithic period with objects such as ceramic vessels, bone spatulas, polished stone axes and many bone awls with flint stone pieces; Argar (2200-1500 BC) cultural finds of the second millennium BC from the villages of the high flat land in the form of copper and bronze objects, hand made pottery, adze, sickle, grain milling and storage and a model of a village of the times, burial boxes made of stone slabs, ceramic jars used as funerary urns and a cenotaph burial urn; the Iberian cultural objects of pottery (made by skilled workmanships using lathes), metallurgical objects, weaving tools, ritual funeral objects and insignia of Iberian falcate along with shield, spears, cover for the falcata, belt buckle, etc.; furniture in tombs of the Iberain period found in the necropolis of Lorca along with bronze objects such as brooches, rings, bracelets, ceramics cups, pyxes, and loom weights, a Greek kylix cup of 5th century BC, furniture of a tomb of the 4th century BC, and many of the ceramics are with inscriptions in Iberian language; the "Pax Romana" period of the first two centuries after Christ with ornamental mosaics in villas of rich people of the valley, ceramics, metal parts, loom weights and lamps of Roman vintage; Roman god Mercury image made in bronze, the Hispano culture represented by objects of pottery, religion and funerary rites, incised ornamentation and chamber pots, representation of Islamic religious buildings such as models of the archway of the mosque of the Cortijo del Centeno in La Tova, Lorca, and objects of Islamic burial rituals; objects from the late Middle Ages such as the 13th-century fortification of the city and its castle with several pieces from the ghetto inside the Castle (up to 1492), Hanukkah and glass lamps from the synagogue; coins and medals covering the Phoenician, Greek, Hellenistic, Ibero-Punic, Iberian, Hispanic-Latino, Roman from the 2nd century until the beginning of 5th century AD, Byzantine and Moorish Spain periods; and Spanish pottery, ceramics glazed in white, gray, molasses and without decoration of the 16th and 17th centuries, the Lorca potteries from the 17th century such as the "jar girlfriend", a creation of a pitcher decorated with glass of the 17th century.
