= Zarcilla de Ramos =

Coordinates: 37°51′N 1°53′W

- Interactive map of Zarcilla de Ramos
- Country: Spain
- Province: Murcia
- Municipality: Lorca
- Elevation: 655 m (2,149 ft)

Population (2010)
  - Total: 1,051

Zarcilla de Ramos is a village in Murcia, Spain. It is part of the municipality of Lorca.

It is the largest provincial council in the Lorca district, with about 109 km² and an important population center, which is reached from the road from Lorca to Caravaca, 28.5 km from the municipal capital.
