= Guadalentín =

River in Spain

Coordinates: 37.9917°N 1.0728°W

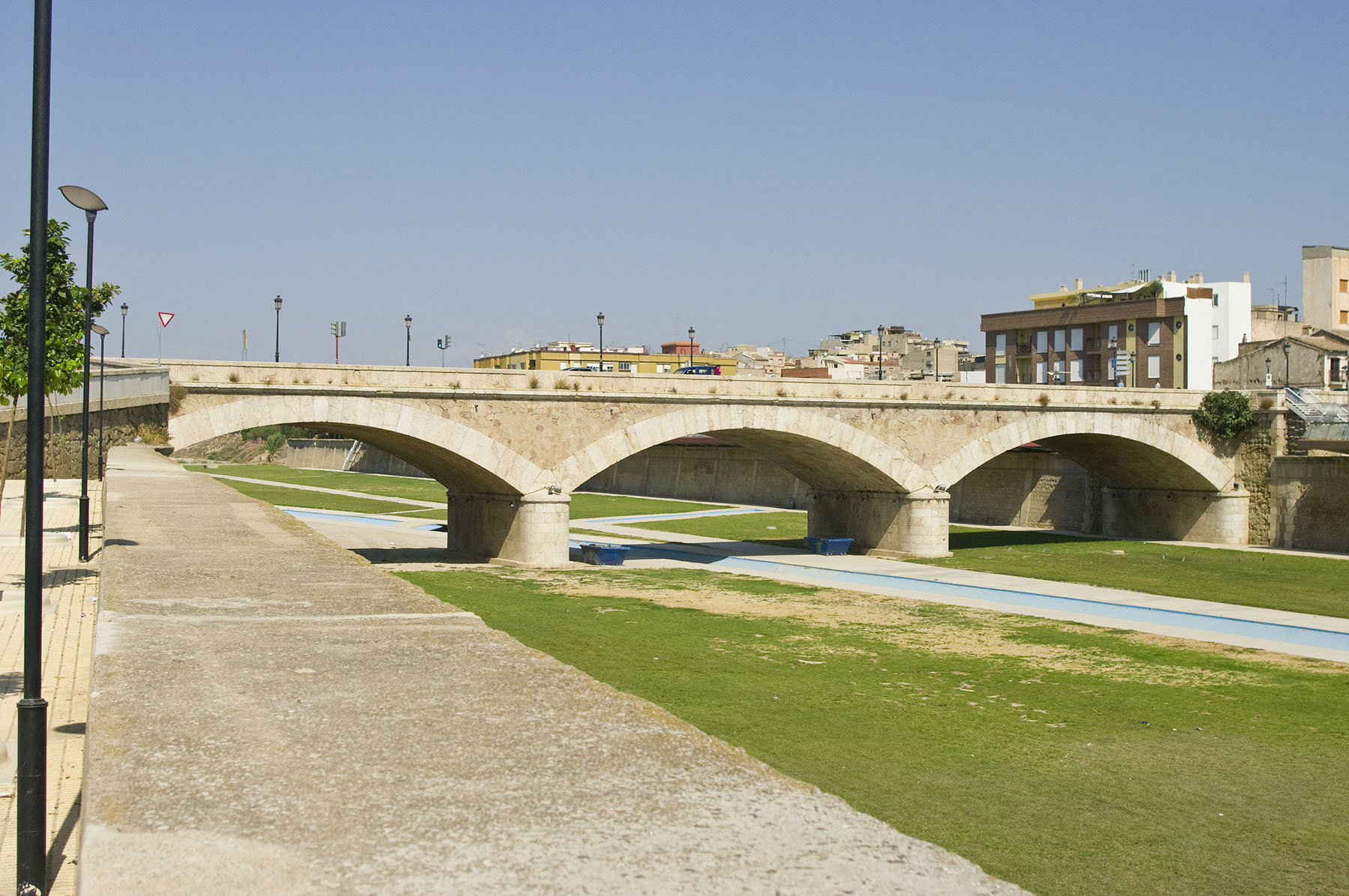
Guadalentín river in Lorca.

Guadalentín is a river in Spain. It is a tributary of the Segura river.

The Guadalentín flows in the southeastern region of Spain, and the Guadalentín River Basin is one of the largest in Spain. The Guadalentín Basin is a flat valley, and comprises the Alto Guadalentín aquifer. The valley is contiguous in the northeast and on the south-east with fault systems.

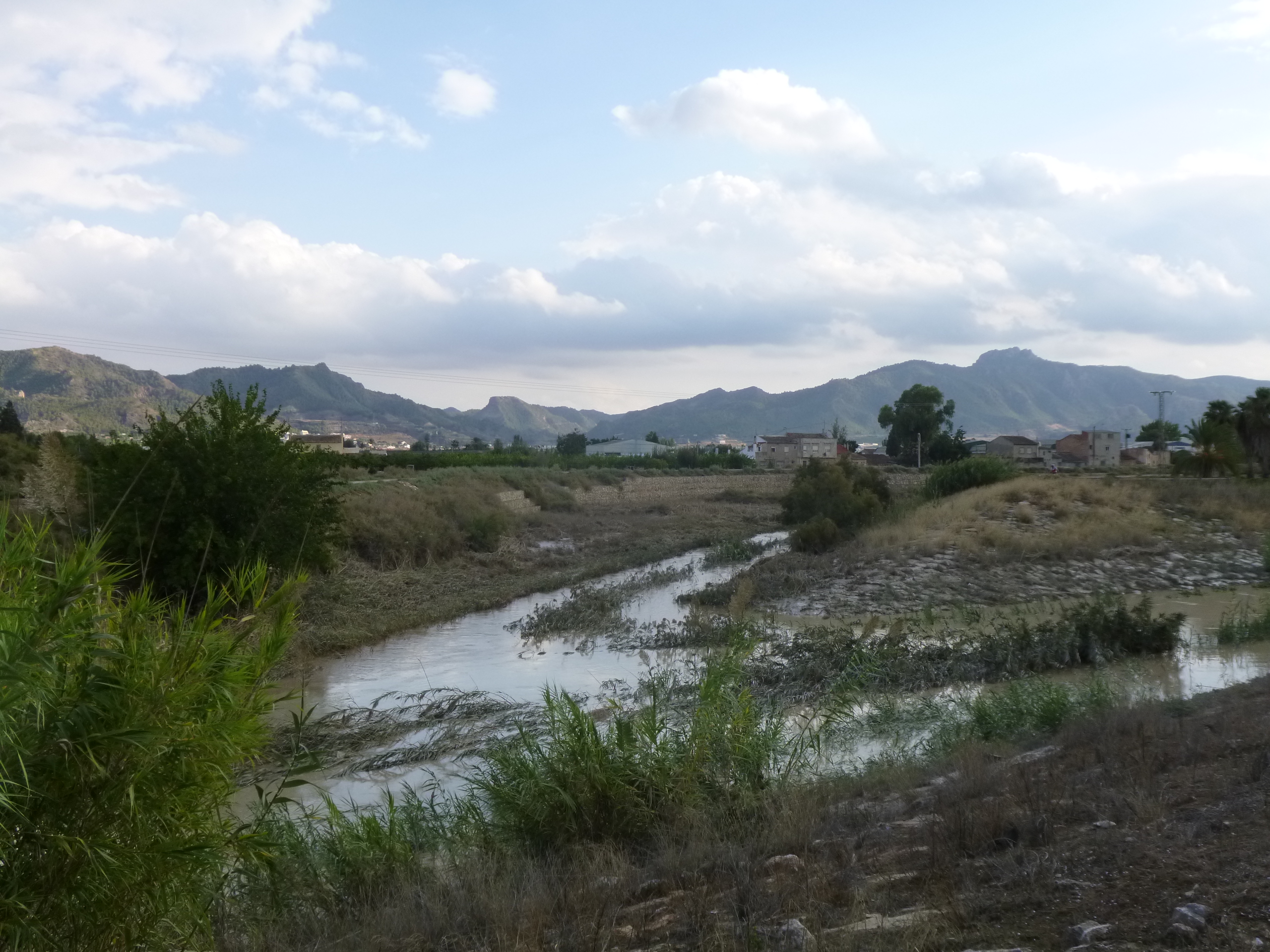
The Guadalentín River.

== See also ==
- List of rivers of Spain
