= Murcian =

Murcian can refer to:

- Murcian Spanish
- Murcian nationalism

== Places of origin ==
- Someone or something from the Region of Murcia: a single-province autonomous community in Spain
- Someone or something from Murcia, Murcia, Spain: the capital of the Region of Murcia
- Someone or something from Murcia, Negros Occidental: a city in the Philippines
- Someone or something from Murcia, Costa Rica: a city in the Region of Cartago, Costa Rica
- Someone or something from Murcia, Bolivia: a city in the Pando Department, Bolivia

== Livestock Breeds ==
- Murciana goat, a dairy goat from the Region of Murcia in Spain

== Mythology ==
- Of or pertaining to Murcia or Murtia: a mythical goddess later merged in meaning with Venus (mythology)
