= Balsicas Atlético =

Association football club in Spain

- Full name: Balsicas Atlético
- Founded: 2002 (as CD Balsicas); 2008 (refounded)
- Dissolved: 2024
- Ground: Municipal Los Cipreses, Balsicas, Torre-Pacheco, Spain
- 2023–24: Tercera Federación – Group 13, 15th of 18
Home colours	Away colours

Balsicas Atlético was a football team based in Balsicas, Torre-Pacheco, in the Region of Murcia. Founded in 2002 and dissolved in 2024, the team last played in Tercera Federación – Group 13. The club's home ground is Campo Municipal Los Cipreses.

== History ==
A club named CD Balsicas previously existed in the city, which started playing in the 1980s before selling their place to newly-created Cartagonova FC in 1995, amidst several financial trouble. Four years later, the club returned to an active status under the name of CD Equidesa Balsicas, and achieved promotion to Tercera División in 2001, before again selling their place to another new club, Lorca Deportiva CF, in 2002.

Centro de Deportes Balsicas was founded in shortly after, and immediately took Algezares CF's place in Territorial Preferente. The club achieved immediate promotion to the fourth division, and remained in the category for three years before suffering relegation.

In 2008, Balsicas was refounded under the name of Balsicas Atlético. In February 2023, the club achieved promotion to Tercera Federación.

After managing to narrowly avoid relegation, Balsicas sold their spot in Tercera for the third time in July 2024, after again having financial problems; Deportivo Marítimo took their place.

== Season to season ==
Season	Tier	Division	Place	Copa del Rey
2002–03	5	Terr. Pref.	4th	
2003–04	4	3ª	12th	
2004–05	4	3ª	14th	
2005–06	4	3ª	19th	
2006–07	5	Terr. Pref.	18th	
2007–08	6	1ª Terr.	5th	

- 3 seasons in Tercera División

=== Team refounded ===
Season	Tier	Division	Place	Copa del Rey
2008–09	7	1ª Terr.	2nd	
2009–10	6	Liga Aut.	6th	
2010–11	6	1ª Aut.	8th	
2011–12	6	1ª Aut.	4th	
2012–13	5	Pref. Aut.	11th	
2013–14	5	Pref. Aut.	4th	
2014–15	5	Pref. Aut.	18th	
2015–16	6	1ª Aut.	5th	

Season	Tier	Division	Place	Copa del Rey
2016–17	5	Pref. Aut.	8th	
2017–18	5	Pref. Aut.	11th	
2018–19	5	Pref. Aut.	15th	
2019–20	5	Pref. Aut.	8th	
2020–21	5	Pref. Aut.	7th	
2021–22	6	Pref. Aut.	7th	
2022–23	6	Pref. Aut.	1st	
2023–24	5	3ª Fed.	15th	

- 1 season in Tercera Federación
