= CD Balsicas =

Association football club in Spain

Balsicas
- Full name: Centro Deportivo Balsicas
- Founded: 1982; 1999 (as CD Equidesa)
- Dissolved: 1995; 2002
- Ground: Municipal Los Cipreses, Balsicas, Torre-Pacheco, Spain
- 2001–02: 3ª – Group 13, 14th of 20
Home colours

Centro Deportivo Balsicas was a football team based in Balsicas, Torre-Pacheco, in the Region of Murcia. The club was dissolved in 2002.

== History ==
Club Deportivo Balsicas started playing in 1982, managing to reach the Regional Preferente before selling their place to newly-created Cartagonova FC in 1995, amidst several financial trouble. Four years later, the club returned to an active status under the name of Club Deportivo Equidesa, and switched name to Centro Deportivo Balsicas in the following year.

Balsicas achieved a first-ever promotion to Tercera División in 2001, before again selling their place to another new club, Lorca Deportiva CF, in 2002. Another club named CD Balsicas was founded in shortly after, and immediately took Algezares CF's place in Territorial Preferente.

== Season to season ==
=== Club Deportivo Balsicas ===
Season	Tier	Division	Place	Copa del Rey
1982–83	7	2ª Reg.	13th	
1983–84	7	2ª Reg.	6th	
1984–85	7	2ª Reg.	5th	
1985–86	6	1ª Reg.	14th	
1986–87	6	1ª Reg.	13th	
1987–88	6	1ª Reg.	12th	
1988–89	6	1ª Reg.	5th	

Season	Tier	Division	Place	Copa del Rey
1989–90	6	1ª Reg.	3rd	
1990–91	5	Reg. Pref.	12th	
1991–92	5	Reg. Pref.	14th	
1992–93	5	Reg. Pref.	14th	
1993–94	5	Reg. Pref.	14th	
1994–95	5	Reg. Pref.	13th	

=== Club Deportivo Equidesa/Centro Deportivo Balsicas ===
Season	Tier	Division	Place	Copa del Rey
1999–2000	5	Terr. Pref.	3rd	
2000–01	5	Terr. Pref.	1st	
2001–02	4	3ª	14th	

- 1 season in Tercera División
