= Regional Council of Murcia =

Governing body of Murcia, Spain

The Regional Council of Murcia was the governing body in the Region of Murcia in the pre-autonomous process. His mandate was from the end of 1978 until the creation of the autonomous community in 1983.

== Creation ==
The Regional Council arises from Royal Decree-Law 30/1978, signed by King Juan Carlos I on September 29, 1978. Created on November 10, 1978. It met for the first time on November 20, being officially established on the 24th. Its work is defined in coordination and collaboration with the Provincial Council of Murcia and was created in the process of drafting the Spanish Constitution of 1978. It was therefore created as a pre-autonomous entity or transitional body.

== Composition ==
It was initially formed with twelve parliamentarians, twelve representatives of the territory, and a representative of the Provincial Council; its president was Antonio Pérez Crespo. After the local elections of 1979, it was constituted with the elected regional deputies, so it is made up of 39 members: twelve parliamentarians and 27 deputies. Its president was Andrés Hernández Ros.

== Functions ==
The functions defined for this council were:

- Carry out the management and administration of the functions and services transferred to it by the State Administration.
- Coordinate with the Provincial Council.
- Propose to the central government any measures that affect the interests of the region of Murcia.
- Prepare and approve your own internal operating rules.

In the exercise of these functions they request to adhere to the autonomous process according to article 143 of the Constitution on June 14, 1980, in a session held in the Town Hall of Totana.

The activity of this pre-autonomous entity was recorded in the Official Bulletin of the Regional Council of Murcia, which was published for the first time on December 31, 1979.

Provisionally, this Regional Council was constituted as Regional Assembly on July 15, 1982, exercising its functions until May 28, 1983, when the chamber was constituted after the elections of May 8. 1983.
