= Balsicas =

Coordinates: 37°49′05″N 0°57′23″W

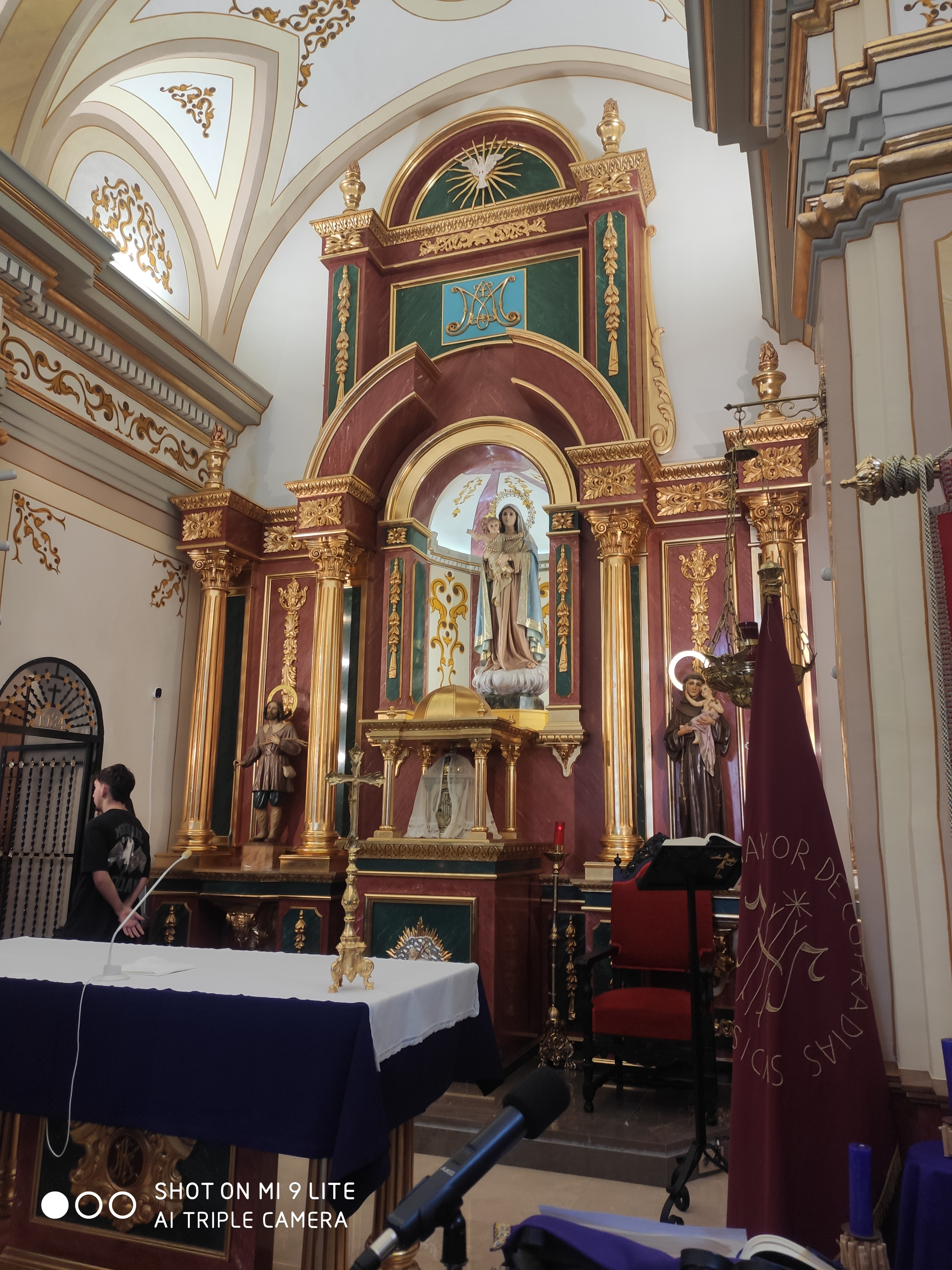
- The baroque altar of Nuestra Senora del Rosario church in Balsicas

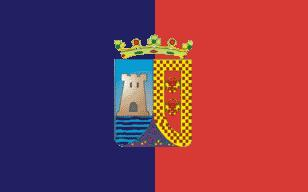
- Flag

- Location in Spain
- Country: Spain
- Autonomous community: Murcia
- Comarca: Mar Menor
- Judicial district: San Javier
- Municipality: Torre-Pacheco
- Elevation: 97 m (318 ft)

Population (2021)
  - Total: 3,305
- Demonym(s): balsiqueño, -ña
- Postal code: 30591

Balsicas is a locality in the municipality of Torre-Pacheco in the autonomous community of Murcia, Spain. It has a population of 3,305 inhabitants.

== History ==
The town was founded in the fifteenth century. Its name is from the word balsa, a Spanish word with several different meaning (raft, or pond) and derives ultimately from the Muslim rule of Spain. The Sima de las Palomas caves had Neanderthal remains.

It boasts historical heritage such as the Castillo del Vizconde Ros and a church dedicated to Our Lady of the Rosary located in the southern part of the town.

== Football ==
Balsicas features a football school and a stadium named "Los Cipreses." The city had three semi-professional clubs: Club Deportivo Balsicas, which played once in Tercera División; Atlético Balsicas, which played only in the 1995–96 season; and Balsicas Atlético, which featured in one Tercera Federación season before selling their place.

== Services ==
Despite being a hamlet, it offers numerous services, including a public primary school, a daycare center, a municipal sports complex equipped with a padel court, an 11-a-side football field, a 7-a-side football field, a swimming pool, a sports pavilion, and a radio-controlled car circuit. There are also facilities for the elderly, a youth center, study rooms, and several outdoor play areas.

== Castillo de Ros ==
The castle was originally built for the Congregation of Saint Philip Neri, on its estate in Balsicas. It was bought by Antonio Ros de Olano y Perpigná, a soldier stationed in Cartagena, in February 1844. Antonio Ros was later named Viscount Ros de Olano and Marquis of Gaud-el-Yehi by Queen Isabella II. Various alterations were made to the building, known as the Castillo de Ros, by his son and grandson.

== Festivals ==
The patronal festivals of Balsicas begin every year on October 22, as the day of its patron, the Our Lady of the Rosary (to which its church is dedicated), coincides with the festivals of Torre-Pacheco. Some events are the coronación de reinas y damas and a laying flowers to Our Lady.

The Semana Santa (Holy Week) celebrations, which have been held since 1987, serve as a cultural focal point for the municipality, hosting the largest celebration in the area with numerous penitential brotherhoods and an increasing number of visitors.

== Transport ==
=== Train ===
Balsicas is an important transport hub in the region, as it is served by the Balsicas-Mar Menor train station on the Chinchilla–Cartagena railway, which connects the Mar Menor area with the rest of the Murcia region and Spain.

=== Road ===
The locality is situated along the RM-19 road and is connected by other roads to nearby settlements such as Avileses, Sucina, and Torre-Pacheco.

It is also located near the "Polaris World La Torre" development. During the summer months, there is increased activity in the town since it serves as a service and leisure area for the residents of the development, many of whom are foreigners (mainly English and German).

Balsicas also features several important infrastructures in the region, including two extensive and well-connected industrial estates.

=== Bus ===
Balsicas is served by an urban public transport line:

Line	Route	Operator
2	Dolores – Balsicas – Roldán – Torre-Pacheco	El Pasico Bus

The intercity bus service in the municipality is part of the Movibus network, the public transport system of the Murcia region (Spain), which includes bus services managed by the autonomous community.
