= Sima de las Palomas =

Archaeological site with Neanderthal remains in the Murcia region of Spain

- Interactive map of Sima de las Palomas
- 37°47′59″N 0°53′45″W
- Type: Intermittent settlement
- Periods: Middle Paleolithic
- Region: Region of Murcia

Site notes
- Elevation: 123 m (404 ft)
- Excavation dates: 1992-

Sima de las Palomas ("Rock-Dove hole") is on Cabezo Gordo, located between Balsicas and San Javier in the Murcia region of Spain. It was inhabited for tens of thousands of years, by Neanderthals and others. The shaft was filled in with brecciated material in the Late Pleistocene, and was partly excavated by miners in the nineteenth century. In the rubble, fossil remains of humans, including those of Neanderthals, were found in the 1990s, and after excavations in the shaft, in 2006-2007 a skeleton of a young Neanderthal woman was found, possibly buried with her child.

== Description ==
The cave is in Torre-Pacheco, in the Region of Murcia. It is a vertical shaft in karst, in the Cabezo Gordo hill, and overlooks Mar Menor, a saltwater lagoon in the Mediterranean. The cave is found under overhanging rock, 123 meters above sea level, and the shaft has a depth of 18 meters. It was filled with brecciated material in the Late Pleistocene, much of which was removed by 19th-century miners who dug a horizontal tunnel toward the shaft, excavated much of it and left the rubble remains on the hillside. The miners were probably looking for water to wash out iron ore for the mining concessions on the hill.)

Archeological investigation started when remains of an individual now called Palomas 1 were found in the rubble; someone had abseiled into the shaft and found a fossil in the sediment a few meters down. It turned out to be the jaws of a Neanderthal, still together, and an important enough find to warrant scientific investigation. The researchers soon discovered that much of the shaft had been dug out and the remains dumped on the hillside; the miners had left an entire column of brecciated Pleistocene material, on the other side of the now 3-meter wide shaft. Excavation necessitated the building of scaffolding from the bottom of the shaft. The presence of nesting rock doves at the time of the investigation gave the shaft its name. Between 1992 and 1999, rubble from the mine was investigated, and after 1994 the shaft itself was investigated; those investigations continue today, under the auspices of the Murcian Association for the Study of Palaeoanthropology and the Quaternary.

== Archeological finds ==
There are three main sites for archeological remains: the rubble left by mining, which are difficult to date and lack context; a "lens" of brecciated éboulis with remains over 50,000 years old; and the layers excavated inside the shaft, with remains of around 40,000 years old. The remains of around 100 human fossils were found, and some of them suggest they may have been buried.

According to the authors of the 2008 study "Late Neandertals in Southeastern Iberia: Sima de las Palomas del Cabezo Gordo, Murcia, Spain", the findings confirm the late occurrence of Neanderthals on the Iberian peninsula, and "suggest microevolutionary processes and/or population contact with contemporaneous modern humans to the north". Morphological variation in the remains falls outside of the expected range of variation among Neanderthals, and "this pattern may be result of genetic drift in relative isolation, directional change or, perhaps more likely, population contact to the north".

=== Palomas 96 ===
An individual called Palomas 96, a young Neanderthal woman discovered in 2006-2007, shows properties of both European Neanderthals (in face, teeth, limbs, and body proportions, but her "locomotor hypertrophy" resembles that of humans of the Late Pleistocene. She was short compared to other Neanderthals.

Palomas 96 (nicknamed "Paloma" by the researchers) was found 85% complete; underneath her was Palomas 97, a child, tentatively referred to as hers. Palomas 96 was found with her elbows bent and her hands touching her forehead, like Palomas 97. The bodies were in this position before rigor mortis had set in, suggesting burial.
