= Flag of the Region of Murcia =

Murcia
- Adopted: 9 June 1983; 43 years ago

The flag of the Region of Murcia was defined in Article 4.1 of the Statute of Autonomy of the Region of Murcia, which established the following:

The flag of the Region of Murcia is rectangular and consists of four castles with battlements or, in the upper left corner, arranged in rows of two, and seven royal crowns in the lower right corner, arranged in four rows, with a pattern of one, three, two, and one, respectively; against a crimson or carmine red background

The four castles evoke the region's history as a frontier zone caught between the Crown of Aragon and the Kingdom of Castile, and the Nasrid Emirate of Granada and the Mediterranean Sea: four territories of land and sea, Christians and Muslims, adventurers and warriors, all of which created a distinct Murcian culture. The four castles also can refer to the four lordships that initially carved up the area after it was conquered by Alfonso X of Castile.

The seven crowns were granted to the Kingdom of Murcia by the Castilian Crown. The first five crowns were granted by Alfonso X on May 14, 1281, when he granted the standard and municipal seal to the capital city of Murcia. The sixth crown was granted by Peter of Castile on 4 May 1361, in honour of the loyalty of Murcia shown to Peter's cause during the War of the Two Peters.

The seventh crown was granted by Philip V of Spain on 16 September 1709 in honour of the loyalty of Murcia shown to Philip's cause during the War of the Spanish Succession.

== Former Flags ==
First Standard of the Kingdom of Murcia (pre-1361)

Standard of the Kingdom of Murcia as part of the Crown of Castile (1266–1361)

Standard of the Kingdom of Murcia as part of the Crown of Castile (1361)

Standard of the Kingdom of Murcia as part of the Crown of Castile (1361–1575)

Province of Murcia (1976–82)

== See also ==
- Coat of arms of the Region of Murcia
- Flags of the autonomous communities of Spain
