= L'Ajuntaera pa la Plática, l'Esturrie y l'Escarculle la Llengua Murciana =

L’Ajuntaera pa la Plática, l'Esturrie y l'Escarculle la Llengua Murciana (Note: Murcian pronunciation: [laxuntæˈeɾa pa la ˈplatika lɛtˈturjej lɛkkaɾˈkuʎe la ˈʎeŋɡwa muɾˈθjana]) (La Asociación para el Habla, la Difusión y el Desarrollo de la Lengua Murciana in Spanish) is a cultural association which seeks expansion of the Murcian language, considering it as a separate language, as well as research of the language. It also seeks to help any people who want to speak or write the language. The number of members as well as the activities they promote (besides their own web) is unknown. No activities are known in the last years in Murcia, where it is supposed to have its headquarters.
