= Murcian nationalism =

School of thought

Flag of the Murcianism.

The Murcian nationalism or Murcianism (Spanish: Nacionalismo murciano, murcianismo) is a nationalist school of thought affirming the Murcian nation, as a people.

The Murcianism defends the land of Murcia, the set of territories of Murcian culture and language, broadly identified with the basin of the Segura river. The Kingdom of Murcia was once located here.

The Murcianism claims recognition and normalization of the Murcian language. This language is as a matter of fact the Catalan dialect spoken in the El Carche mountain region of North-East Murcia.

After 1978 the political Murcianism has been represented by several parties (Partido del País Murciano, Partido Regionalista Murciano, Partido Murcianista, Nueva Región, Unión de los Pueblos de Múrcia, Unión Democrática de la Región de Murcia-Coalición Ciudadana Regional). Although n has achieved representation in an autonomous Parliament conditioned by an electoral system. The feeling of belonging to Spain is overwhelmingly dominant among the people of Murcia.
