= Murcian Spanish =

Dialect

- murciano
- Pronunciation: [muɾˈθjano]
- Native to: Spain
- Region: Murcia, Andalusia (Almería, partially in Jaén and Granada), Castile–La Mancha (Albacete) and Valencia (Vega Baja, Alicante)
- Language family: Indo-European: Italic; Latino-Faliscan; Romance; Italo-Western; Western; Ibero-Romance; West Iberian; Castilian; Spanish; Peninsular Spanish; Murcian Spanish
- Early forms: Proto-Indo-European: Proto-Italic; Proto-Latino-Faliscan; Old Latin; Vulgar Latin; ...; Old Spanish; Early Modern Spanish
- Writing system: Spanish orthography (Latin script)

Official status
- Official language in: Spain

Language codes
- ISO 639-3: –
- Glottolog: None
- IETF: es-u-sd-esmc
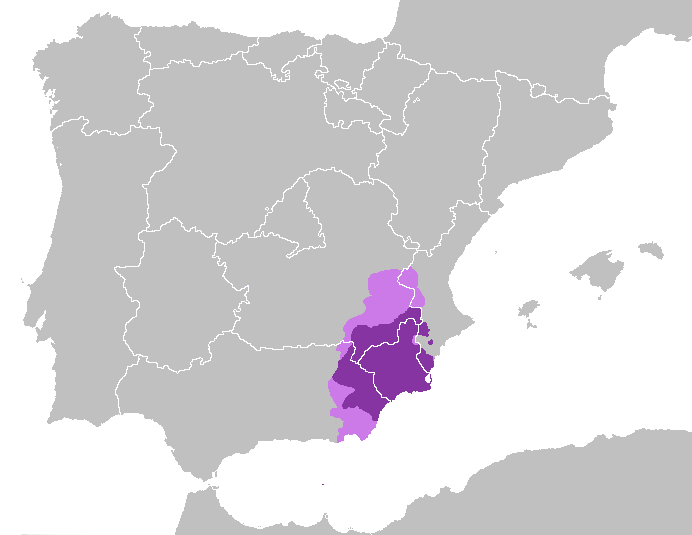

Murcian (endonym: murciano) is a variant of Peninsular Spanish, spoken mainly in the autonomous community of Murcia and the adjacent comarcas of Vega Baja del Segura and Alto Vinalopó in the province of Alicante (Valencia), and the corridor of Almansa in Albacete (Castile–La Mancha). In a greater extent, it may also include some areas that were part of the former Kingdom of Murcia, such as southeastern Albacete (now part of Castile–La Mancha) and parts of Almería, Jaén and Granada (now part of Andalusia).

Murcian linguistically borders Valencian (Catalan) and other Southern Peninsular Spanish varieties. The linguistic varieties of Murcian form a dialect continuum with Eastern Andalusian and Manchego Peninsular Spanish.

Murcian is considered a separate language from Spanish by some of its native speakers and by proponents of Murcianism, who call it llengua murciana. The term panocho is also used to designate the Murcian language; however it mostly refers to the variety spoken in the comarca of the Huerta de Murcia.

== History ==
Murcian emerged from the mixture of several linguistic varieties that joined after the Kingdom of Murcia was conquered by the Crown of Aragon and the Crown of Castile and populated with principally northeastern settlers in the 13th and 14th centuries. The linguistic varieties were mainly Tudmir's Romance (a type of Andalusi Romance), Arabic, Aragonese, Old Castilian and Occitano-Catalan. In modern times Murcian has also been influenced by French and Caló.

== Phonetic features of Murcian ==
=== Consonants ===
Consonants of Murcian
	Labial		Dental		Alveolar		Post-alv./ Palatal		Velar	
Nasal		m				n		ɲ		(ŋ)
Stop	p	b	t	d			tʃ	ʝ	k	ɡ
Continuant	f	b	θ	d	s		(ʃ)	ʝ	x	ɡ
Lateral						l		ʎ		
Tap						ɾ				
Trill						r				

Like in most Iberian languages and dialects, /b, d, ɡ/ become lenited to approximants or fricatives in syllable onsets, after continuants (exceptions include /d/ after lateral consonants): /b/ → [β], /d/ → [ð], /ɡ/ → [ɣ].

The most notable characteristics of a Murcian accent involve the heavy reduction of syllable-final consonants, as well as the frequent loss of /d/ from the suffixes -ado/-ada, -ido/-ida. No non-nasal consonants are permitted in word-final position. As is typical of Spanish, syllable-final nasals are neutralized, and assimilate to the place of articulation of a following consonant. In Murcian, as in many other varieties, the word-final nasal is typically realized as a velar [ŋ] when not followed by a consonant.

Non-liquid, non-nasal postvocalic consonants in the syllable coda assimilate to both the place and the manner of articulation of the following consonant, producing a geminate. For instance, historical /kt/, /pt/ and /st/ all fall together as /tt/, rendering cacto ('cactus'), capto ('I understand'), and casto ('chaste') homophonous as [ˈkatːo]. Historical /kst/ also joins this neutralization, rendering sexta ('sixth' [f.]) homophonous with secta ('sect') as [ˈsetːa]. Other historical postvocalic clusters affected by this include /sp, sd, sk, sɡ, sm, sn, sl/, in each case producing a geminated second element: [pː, dː, kː, ɡː, mː, nː, lː] (with [ðː] being an alternative to [dː]). This produces minimal pairs differentiated by consonant length, such as cisne [ˈθinːe] ('swan') vs. cine [ˈθine] ('cinema'). This process also occurs across word boundaries, as in los nenes [lɔnˈnɛnɛ] ('the kids').

Syllable-final /r/ can assimilate to a following /l/ or /n/, while syllable-final /l/ may assimilate to a following /r/ and become a tapped [ɾ] before any other consonant.

In casual speech, syllable- and word-final /s/ is never pronounced as a sibilant [s]. It is usually elided entirely or forms part of a geminate, although in areas bordering Andalusia it may be debuccalized, pronounced as an [h]. In older working-class rural speech, syllable-final /s/ surfaces as [ɾ] before word-initial consonants (particularly the voiced plosives and /n/), as in los vasos [lɔɾ ˈβæsɔ] ('the glasses'). /b, d, ɡ/ are lenited after this allophone. The replacement of [s] with [ɾ] is perceived as a very marked feature of rural Murcian, and it is disapproved of by the local population.

The phones /d/ (phon. [ð]), /θ/ and the rare /x/ are frequently elided in word-final position: pared [paˈɾe] ('wall'), vez [ˈbɛ] ('time') and reloj [reˈlo] ('clock'). Other elisions include final /t/ (often reflected in the Spanish orthography as carnet → carné 'ID card / driving licence') and variably the rest of final obstruents (found mainly in loanwords).

The vowels /i/ and /u/ have as non-vocalic correlates the semivowels (glides) [j] and [w] (also represented as [i̯] and [u̯]), respectively, which form a diphthong.

Further notes:

- While the word para is frequently realized as pa' in all Spanish varieties, in Murcian Spanish this is much more widespread, being more common among the upper classes and in more formal situations than in other zones.

==== Phonetic development ====
There are linguistic phenomena characteristic of traditional Murcian speech, many of which are or were usual in other linguistic varieties (Aragonese, Mozarabic, Catalan, Andalusian, etc.):

- Word-initial /l/ has been palatalized to /ʎ/, as in llengua, corresponding to standard Castilian lengua, 'language, tongue'.
- In some areas, /ʎ/ and /ʝ/ are neutralized to [ʎ], as opposed to the more usual [ʝ] typical of yeísmo. This has been called ultralleísmo.
- An older /dʒ/ has been devoiced to /tʃ/, resulting in words like minchar 'to eat', cognate to Catalan menjar.
- The frequent preservation of voiceless intervocalic consonants or other voiceless consonants that used to be voiced or are voiced in standard Spanish: cocote (cogote in Spanish), cocotazo, cancro (cangrejo in Spanish), parata (parada), sermonata (sermonada), atoba (adobe), acachar, alcayata, engangrenar, cangrena, pescatero, pinato (pino joven), gayato (cayado), falluto (huero), capolar, Caputa (a place in Mula), caparra (garrapata), capítulo (cabildo), súpito (súbito), molata, La Mulata, escorrata, pescatero, Ficaria (a place in Blanca), poyata (Lorca), volandero, etc.
- The frequent voicing of voiceless consonants: gambusino (campesino), morga (morca), alhábega (albahaca), chiguito (chiquito), regüestar (recostar), bambulla (lat. ampulla), etc.
- The frequent preservation of Latin group cl: clamar, 'llamar' and also "pl" (plantaje, El Plan).
- The frequent preservation of Latin group fl: flama (llama, calor), flamante (llameante), flamar, suflama/soflama, inflar, infleta, botinflar, botinflao, etc.
- The frequent maintenance of Latin /f/ in its original form (fenazar, fenás, vafada, fito a fito, manifacero, ferrija, Ficaria, figue, etc.) or aspirated (it is always aspirated before /u/ like in huerte, huerza, huente, humar, humo, conhundir, etc.; it is maintained in certain cases before /o/ like in hormar, hondo, hongo, hopo, etc. and before /a/ in haldar, hambre, etc.
- The presence of the intervocalic consonant cluster ns: ansa, nansa, pansa, pansir, pansío, suspensar, ansín, ansina, etc.
- A consonantal alternation between voiceless /k/ and /t/: La Rápita or La Rápica, tavacote (cavacote), tápena (caparis), friolenco, cantamusa, a tatas (a catas < a gatas), chito (chico, in Cieza), etc.
- Change from b to m: mandurria, Menjú (Abenhud, from Arabic Ibn Hud), meneno, comenencia, moñiga, camota (cabota), etc.

=== Vowels ===
Murcian Spanish vowel chart

Vowels of Murcian
	Front	Back
Close	i	u
Near-close	(ɪ)	(ʊ)
Close-mid	e	o
Open-mid	(ɛ)	(ɔ)
Near-open	(æ)	
Open	a	

The vowel system of Murcian is essentially the same as many parts of Andalusian (especially its Eastern provinces).

The open-mid vowels [ɛ, ɔ] as well as the near-open front [æ] are realizations of /eC, oC, aC/ (where ⟨C⟩ stands for any consonant other than /n/ or /d/) in the syllable coda. Due to vowel harmony, the close-mid [e, o] and the open central [ä] (hereafter transcribed without the diacritic) are banned from occurring in any syllable preceding that with [ɛ, ɔ, æ]. This change is sometimes called vowel opening, but this is completely inaccurate for the [a]–[æ] pair, in which the main difference is backness (/aC/ is more front than /a/; although there are exceptions). Thus, the contrast between mañanas /maˈɲanas/ and the singular form mañana /maˈɲana/ ('morning') surfaces as a contrast of vowel quality: [mæˈɲænæ] (plural) vs. [maˈɲana] (singular), rather than the presence of terminal [s] in the former word.

Some authors have questioned whether the opening of the high vowels /i, u/ (to [ɪ, ʊ]) is significant (cfr., e.g., Zubizarreta, 1979, Poch / Llisterri, 1986, Sanders, 1994), while others argue that, although the opening is less than in the case of middle and low vowels, it is entirely relevant (cfr., e.g., Alonso / Canellada / Zamora Vicente, 1950, Mondéjar, 1979, Alarcos, 1983). In any case, the opening of these final high vowels also triggers vowel harmony.

== Other characteristics ==
The diminutive suffix is -iquio [-ikʲo], which is likely related to -ico [-iko] (also used in Murcian).

== See also ==
- L'Ajuntaera pa la Plática, l'Esturrie y l'Escarculle la Llengua Murciana
- Language secessionism
- Spanish dialects

== Bibliography ==
- Alberto Sevilla. Vocabulario Murciano
- García Soriano. Vocabulario del Dialecto Murciano
- García Cotorruelo-Emilia. Estudio sobre el habla de Cartagena y su comarca.
- Molina Fernández, Patricio. Parablero Murciano.
- Muñoz Cortés-Manuel. El habla de la Huerta.
- Aguilar Gil, Pedro. Raíces, habla y costumbres de los huertanos. A.A.V.V. Torrealta. Molina. 1999.
- Álvar López, Manuel. Estudios sobre las hablas meridionales. Universidad de Granada. Granada. 2004.
- Álvar López, Manuel. Las hablas meridionales de España y su interés para la lingüística comparada. Atlas Lingüístico de Andalucía, Tomo 1, nº. 2. Universidad de Granada. Granada. 1956.
- Díez de Revenga, Francisco Javier y De Paco, Mariano. Historia de la literatura murciana. Editora Regional. Murcia. 1989.
- Hernández-Campoy, Juan Manuel (January 2008). "Sociolinguistic aspects of Murcian Spanish". International Journal of the Sociology of Language (193/194): 121–138. doi:10.1515/IJSL.2008.051. S2CID 143708581.
- Ibarra Lario, Antonia. Materiales para el conocimiento del habla de Lorca y su comarca. Universidad de Murcia. Murcia. 1996.
- Monroy, Rafael; Hernández-Campoy, Juan Manuel (2015), "Murcian Spanish" (PDF), Journal of the International Phonetic Association, 45 (2): 229–240, doi:10.1017/S0025100314000231
- Pountain, Christopher J. (2012). "Spanish Among the Ibero-Romance Languages". In Hualde, José Ignacio; Olarrea, Antxon; O'Rourke, Erin (eds.). The Handbook of Hispanic Linguistics. Hoboken: Blackwell Publishing. pp. 47–64. doi:10.1002/9781118228098.ch3. ISBN 9781405198820.
- Zamora Vicente, Alonso (1967), Dialectología española (2nd ed.), Biblioteca Romanica Hispanica, Editorial Gredos, ISBN 9788424911157
