= Antonio Pérez Crespo =

Spanish politician (1929–2012)

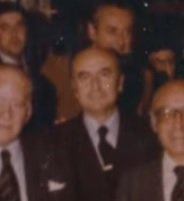
Undated photo of Antonio Pérez Crespo

Antonio Pérez Crespo (Murcia, 16 June 1929 - ibidem, 17 March 2012) was a Spanish writer and politician. He was the first president of the Regional Council of Murcia, the pre-autonomous body of the Region of Murcia. He was also a deputy for the Democratic Center Union in the 1977 elections and a senator in the 1979 elections.

== Biography ==
He completed secondary studies at the Alfonso at the University of Murcia.

Between 1961 and 1971 he was the president of the Board of the Port of Cartagena and also a member of the National Union of the Merchant Navy, he also collaborated in the founding in 1968 of the Franco Depot Consortium of the Port of Cartagena in order to facilitate international trade in merchandise.

His political participation as a member of the Catholic Association of Propagandists was notable and allowed him to become the leader of the Murcian Democratic Union party, with a Christian Democracy tendency. This party joined the coalition Unión de Centro Democrático in May 1977. Pérez Crespo actively participated in the political process of the transition in the Region of Murcia and with greater intensity in the formation of the autonomous community: he was part of the permanent commission of the working body for the preparation of the Statute of Autonomy and was appointed President of the Regional Council. As a representative of the UCD he was deputy for the province of Murcia in the Cortes during the constituent period which allowed him to participate in the approval of the Constitution and in the elections of 1979 he was elected senator. At the end of his mandate he dedicated himself more to his professional activity and to research on topics related to the region.

He was official chronicler of the Region of Murcia since its creation in 2003 and published different investigations on historical and economic topics. Among his publications are: "The novels about Murcia: 1939-1981" (1981), "The lizard and his time" (1988), "Uses and customs in sharecropping in the province of Murcia" (1989) which was a topic that earned him the prize of San Raimundo de Peñafort, he later published "El cantón murciano" (1990), "Diálogo y Consenso" (1993), "Agua seca y bitter" (1995), "Jumilla, entre cantonals y carlistas: la Lozano" (1995), "Murcia: the city" (1996), "Looking to the future with hope" (1997), "In your hand you had the cave" (1999), "History of the periodical press in the city of Murcia" (2000), "Reflections of an old ex-president" (2001), "An Arab garden in Arrixaca" (2002), "The burial of the sardine and the garden side in the 19th century", "The Virgin of "FuenSanta", patron saint of Murcia (2005), ""La Región", a Murcian newspaper of the Second Republic" (2005), "With time and a cane, even the green ones fall" (2005), "Ntra . Mrs. de la Arrixaca: between legend, tradition and history: Our Lady of the Olmos, Santa María la Real de las Huertas, Santa María del Rosel" (2007), "The great coalition" (2008) and "The origins and implementation of the Tajo-Segura transfer: a personal chronicle" (2009).

He received recognition from various institutions for which he was a Favorite Son of the city of Murcia and had the Commendation of the Order of Civil Merit, of the Order of Constitutional Merit and the Gold Medal of the Region of Murcia.
