= Coat of arms of the Region of Murcia =

Coat of arms of the Región de Murcia

Versions
- Logo
- Armiger: Region of Murcia
- Adopted: 1982
- Crest: Spanish Royal Crown
- Shield: Gules, at the dexter chief four castles Or two and two, at the sinister base, seven crowns Or one, three, two, and one
- Earlier version(s): see below

The coat of arms of the Region of Murcia is described in the article 4 of the Spanish Organic Law 4 of 9 June 1982, the Statute of Autonomy of the Region of Murcia and further regulated by Decree 34 of 8 June 1983, approving the official design and use of the coat of arms of the Region of Murcia.

== Shield ==
The first official description of the coat of arms remits to the elements of the flag and is composed as follows:

«Article 4:

1st. The flag of the Region of Murcia is rectangular and consists of four castles with battlements or, in the upper left corner, arranged in rows of two, and seven royal crowns in the lower right corner, arranged in four rows, with a pattern of one, three, two, and one, respectively; against a crimson or carmine red background.

2nd. The coat of arms will have the same symbols and distribution as the flag, with the royal crown.»

— Statute of Autonomy of the Region of Murcia

Given the lack of precision to define a correct blazon, was approved a decree on 8 June 1983 blazoned the shield of the region as follows:

«Article 1:

According to Article 4.2 of the Statute of Autonomy, the Region of Murcia has its own coat of arms. The blazon of these arms is: A Spanish (round) shaped escutcheon Red or Gules field. At the dexter canton, four castles Or placed two to two forming a square. At the sinister base, seven crowns Or placed in four rows, with a pattern of one, three, two, and one.

At the top of the escutcheon, a royal crown, for being Murcia a former kingdom.»

— Decree 34/1983

The four castles evoke the region's history as a frontier zone caught between the Crown of Aragon and the Kingdom of Castile, and the Nasrid Kingdom of Granada and the Mediterranean Sea: four territories of land and sea, Christians and Muslims, adventurers and warriors, all of which created a distinct Murcian culture. The four castles also can refer to the four lordships that initially carved up the area after it was conquered by Alfonso X of Castile.

The seven crowns were granted to the Kingdom of Murcia by the Castilian Crown. The first five crowns were granted by Alfonso X on 14 May 1281, when he granted the standard and municipal seal to the capital city of Murcia. The sixth crown was granted by Peter of Castile on 4 May 1361, in honour of the loyalty of Murcia shown to Peter's cause during the War of the Two Peters. The seventh crown was granted by Philip V of Spain on 16 September 1709 in honour of the loyalty of Murcia shown to Philip's cause during the War of the Spanish Succession.

== Official design ==
- The official design is commonly used by the autonomous institutions of Murcia, although it coexists with a simplified design of it (a logo).
- According to the official blazon, the official design is not designed to conform to traditional heraldic rules.
- The blazon does not specify that the castles not specify that they are open or they must have voided gates and windows, usually Azure, and their design should include at least two windows.
- Proportions of the charges in relation to the dimensions of the shield are wrong, according to the blazon, they are inscribed in the dexter canton and the sinister base, so each group of charges should equal the ninth part of the escutcheon.

Coat of arms of the former Council of the Province of Murcia

- The shield shape is rectangular with convex corners at the bottom and the Spanish style, with an almost semicircular bottom edge. The official design has a bordure Or not blazoned.
- The Spanish Royal Crown has not a cap Gules, an element commonly represented in Spanish heraldry.
- The escutcheon of the official logo, approved in 2008, best fits to the official blazon.

== Former Provincial Council ==
Shortly before the establishment of the self-government, the Council of the Province of Murcia officially approved a coat of arms, that was used previously since 12 July 1976 (the Spanish monarchy was restored in November 1975). The provincial coat of arms appeared in the center of a cobalt blue flag. The Murcia Province quarterings and a central inescutcheon were standing for: Caravaca de la Cruz, Cartagena, Cieza, Lorca, Mula, Totana, La Unión, Yecla and the City of Murcia (inescutcheon). The crest was the Spanish Royal Crown. Its usage ended with the adoption of the current symbols of the autonomous community on 9 August 1982.

== See also ==
- Flag of the Region of Murcia
