= Kingdom of Murcia =

Historic state

Kingdom of Murcia Reino de Murcia
- Realm of the Crown of Castile; Region of the Kingdom of Spain
- 1266–1833
- Top Flag: 1266–1361; Bottom Flag: 1361–1575 Coat of arms

- Capital: Murcia
  - Type: Manoralism
- History
  - Annexed by Castile: 1266
  - Territorial division of Spain: 1833
| Preceded by | Succeeded by |
| Taifa of Murcia | Province of Murcia; Province of Albacete |
- Today part of: Spain

After roughly two decades as a protectorate of the Crown of Castile, the territory of the Taifa of Murcia became the Kingdom of Murcia (Spanish: Reino de Murcia, a territorial jurisdiction of the Crown of Castile) in the wake of its conquest by Aragon and ensuing return to Castile triggered by the 1264–1266 Mudéjar revolt. It preserved such status up until Javier de Burgos' provincial division of Spain in 1833. This was a "kingdom" ("reino") in the second sense given by the Diccionario de la lengua española de la Real Academia Española: the Crown of Castile consisted of several such kingdoms. Its extent is detailed in Respuestas Generales del Catastro de Ensenada (1750–54), which was part of the documentation of a census. Falling largely within the present-day Region of Murcia, it also included parts of the province of Albacete, the municipalities of Villena and Sax in the province of Alicante, and some localities in the province of Jaén.

Like the other kingdoms within Spain, the Kingdom of Murcia was abolished by the 1833 territorial division of Spain.

The title "King of Murcia" was used by the monarchs of the Crown of Castile and today constitutes one of the historical titles of the Spanish Crown.

== See also ==
- Murcian nationalism
