= Torre-Pacheco =

- Municipality
- Flag Coat of arms

- Location in Murcia

- Location in Spain Torre-Pacheco (Spain)
- Coordinates: 37°44′35″N 0°57′14″W
- Country: Spain
- Autonomous Community: Region of Murcia
- Province: Region of Murcia
- Comarca: Comarca del Mar Menor
- Own municipality: 1836

Government
  - Mayor: Pedro Ángel Roca Tornel (PP)

Area
  - Total: 189 km^{2} (73 sq mi)
- Elevation (AMSL): 40 m (130 ft)

Population (2025-01-01)
  - Total: 41,479
  - Density: 219/km^{2} (568/sq mi)
- Time zone: UTC+1 (CET)
  - Summer (DST): UTC+2 (CEST (GMT +2))
- Postal code: 30700
- Area code: +34 (Spain) + 968 (Murcia)
- Website: www.torrepacheco.es

Torre-Pacheco (Spanish pronunciation: [torepaˈtʃeko]) is a municipality in the autonomous community of Murcia in southeastern Spain. It covers an area of 189.4 square kilometres (73.1 sq mi) and its population in 2019 was 35,676. The only high ground in the municipality is Cabezo Gordo hill, the location of the protected Sima de las Palomas archeological site. The town has one secondary education institution, the I.E.S. Gerardo Molina.

The municipality has four golf courses, and its windmills are known region wide.

== Geography ==
=== Physical geography ===
Torre-Pacheco municipality is located in the Campo de Cartagena region. Cabezo Gordo is one of its highest hills, at 312 metres (1,024 ft) above sea level. It has no rivers with a permanent water flow, although during rainy periods streams in several arroyos (sometimes called ramblas) flow into coastal saltwater lagoon the Mar Menor. Soil in the area mainly comprises sedimentary materials (loam, sandstone and limestone).

Torre-Pacheco is semi-enclosed by mountains. To the north lie the Columbares, Carrascoy, El Puerto de la Cadena, Escalona and Altalona ranges, and to the south the ranges of La Unión, Roldán, La Muela, Las Victorias and Cartagena.

The surrounding mountains have a significant influence on the semi-arid, Mediterranean climate of the municipality. Rainfall is usually below 300 millimetres, but when it occurs rain is often torrential. Highest rainfall occurs in autumn and spring, and the rainiest months are October and April. Temperatures are generally high, with a yearly average of 18 °C (64 °F). Summers are hot, but can appear mild because of sea breezes. Winters are mild, with an average temperature of 10 °C (50 °F).

Human activity has had a major impact on the territory, resulting in particular from the mechanization of local agriculture in the 1950s and 1960s.

=== Human geography ===
In 2019, the municipality had a total population of 35,676. Of its towns and villages, Torre-Pacheco had 18,196 inhabitants, with 6,759 in Roldán (located in the northeastern quarter), 3,198 in Balsicas (placed in the north), 2,295 in Dolores (which occurs in the east), 1,212 in El Jimenado (located in the southwestern quarter), 1,212 in San Cayetano (placed in the northwest), 1,239 in Hoyamorena (which occurs in the southeast), 599 Hortichuela (located in the centre), 218 in El Abardinal (placed in the south), 178 in Santa Rosalía (which occurs in the southeast quarter), and 144 in Los Camachos (located in the eastern half).

== Demographics ==
As of 2020, 30.34% inhabitants are foreigners - 18.23% are Africans, 5.22% are European, 4.67% are Americans, and 2.22% are Asian. The below table shows total population per decade.

	1900	1910	1920	1930	1940	1950	1960	1970	1981	1991	2001	2011
Population	8,358	9,782	9,400	9,255	9,610	10,260	11,005	13,006	15,654	16,568	24,332	33,419

== History ==
The territory of the current municipality has been inhabited since the Lower Paleolithic. There is evidence of occupation by Homo heidelbergensis between 150,000 and 125,000 BC at the Sima de las Palomas site on Cabezo Gordo hill. Neanderthals also lived in the area from 120,000 to 35,000 BC.

The 16 Roman villas found in the area date back to the period of Roman Hispania. The Romans quarried marble from a Cabezo Gordo deposit. Among economic activities in the area, fertile soils made it suitable for crop growing and livestock farming.

The first historic references to Torre-Pacheco date back to the 13th century.

Landowners settling in the area of today's municipality in the Late Middle Ages gave their names to its towns and villages. The Saavedra family came from Galicia, the Roda family from Navarre, and the Pacheco family from Portugal. On 7 November 1478, the council of Murcia granted land to Pedro Pacheco. The tower and country property he built founded the town of Torre-Pacheco and gave it its name.

Settlements became established as families acquired land and built farmhouses, and the defensive towers that were their only protection given their distance from castles and mountains. These tower structures served for communication with the local population, and sheltered inhabitants from Berber raids in the area between the 13th and 18th centuries.

In the mid-16th century, the population increased in the Campo de Cartagena comarca, to which the territory belongs. This trend continued during the 17th century, as more people arrived. Los Álcazares, Fuente Álamo and Torre-Pacheco were the first settlements in the region where before there had only been sparsely scattered buildings. New localities formed between the 16th and 18th centuries. They included Balsicas, Roldán, Dolores, and Lo Ferro, a settlement founded when a Genoese family acquired land and settled in Murcia. Small churches and chapels were built the 17th century, and two of these gave their names to the villages of San Cayetano and Los Dolores.

In 1813, under the first Spanish Constitution of 1812 the Torre-Pacheco area became independent from the municipality of Murcia, and its town council was established. The Constitution was repealed by King Ferdinand VII the following year. During the Trienio Liberal (1820–1823) Torre-Pacheco's town council was reestablished. It was made permanent on 17 September 1836.

In 1900, the population of the area was 8,549. Fifty years later, it had increased to 10,409.

Unemployment in Torre-Pacheco was high for much of this period. Non-irrigated cultivation of cereal crops, almonds, grapes and olives was almost the only farming possible.

Since the 1950s, with the influx of technology and foreign farm workers, agriculture has become a major economic activity in the region. The main crops grown are artichoke, lettuce, broccoli, watermelon and melon.

In July 2025, Torre Pacheco was the scene of a series of riots characterised by xenophobic violence and clashes between organised groups. The incidents began following an assault on a 68-year-old neighbour, allegedly perpetrated by three young men of North African origin, which was used by far-right groups and anti-immigration collectives - such as Deport Them Now and members of Desokupa - to call for demonstrations and “neighbourhood patrols”. These actions led to hunts against migrants, especially in the San Antonio neighbourhood, which is mainly inhabited by foreigners. An extensive police operation was deployed, resulting in 14 arrests, many of them with criminal records.

== Economy ==
One of the main economy activities of Torre-Pachecho is agriculture. 62.8% of the territory is occupied by crop lands. The most widely grown products are the artichokes, melons and lettuces. 83.12% agreements corresponded to agriculture jobs in 2018 and 85.28% were signed by labourers.

Other noteworthy sectors are animal husbandry and services. 14.09% of the contracts existed in the tertiary sector area in Torre-Pacheco.

== Government ==
As generally in Spain, the governors are elected indirectly by voting for a political party in the autonomous community and municipality elections every four years. The political parties chooses the concejales (governors) from the votes and is occurs proportionally according to the votes. There is a largest government body named consistorio, which is made up of 21 members in Torre-Pacheco and a governing cabinet named equipo de gobierno municipal. The alcalde (head governor, equivalent of mayor) is elected from the members of the consistorio and he chooses the members of the equipo de gobierno. Nine members of the consistorio are partisans of Partido Independiente de Torre-Pacheco, eight members are partisans of Partido Socialista Obrero Español, three members are partisans of Vox, two members are partisans of Partido Popular and one member is partisan of Somos Región. The partisans of Partido Independiente de Torre-Pacheco and Paritio Socialista Obrero Español are also members of the governing cabinet.

Governing party
2007–2011	Partido Popular
2011–2015	Partido Popular
2015–2019	Partido Popular (until December) and Partido Independiente de Torre-Pacheco

== Healthcare ==
The municipality is included in the Health area VIII (Mar Menor) of Region of Murcia. Two of the eight subareas occupy territory of the municipality: Torre-Pacheco Este (East Torre-Pacheco) and Torre-Pacheco Oeste (West Torre-Pacheco). The territory is home to five consultorios (primary healthcentre with fewer functions than the centros de salud) and they are distributed in the following way: one consultorio for Roldán, another for Balsicas, there is also a consultorio in Los Dolores, another one in El Jimenado and San Cayetano also hosts a health centre with this category. Two centros de salud are placed in the main town.

== Education ==
2 public early childhood and primary education centres, a concertado (private with government money supply) primary and secondary centre, and 2 public secondary education centres are located in the main town. Some villages such as Garre, Dolores, Alba, San Cayetano and Roldán host an early childhood and primary education centre. There is also a secondary education centre in Roldán.

Other centres that can be found in the main town are one of the national language teaching institution and another for agriculture education, where degrees of vocational education about this area are taught. A centre for adult education (CEA) is also located in the town.

== Transportation ==
Part of the A-30 national highway occurs in the south-west and near El Jimenado. The highway also takes place in the border between Lobosillo (Murcian exclave district) and Torre-Pacheco and the border between Fuente Álamo de Murcia and Torre-Pacheco. There is also a regional road named RM-F14, which connects the A-30 highway to the main town; the RM-F, which connects Cartagena and Torre-Pacheco; the RM-F36, which connects Cartagena and Torre-Pacheco; the RM-F30 road, which connects Torre-Pacheco and Los Alcázares; the RM-F21, which connects Torre-Pacheco and Roldán; and a few other regional roads.

The bus station is placed in the south-eastern quarter of the main town. Bus services from and to Murcia, Cartagena, Elche, Alicante, and other populated places are available. A railway traverses the municipality from south to north and occurs next to Torre-Pacheco by its west and next to Balsicas by its east. There is also a train station in both localities.

== Main sights ==
- Centre for the Performing Arts, C.A.E.S.: The Centre for the Performing Arts (Centro de Artes Escénicas, C.A.E.S.), inaugurated on 16 September 2006, is an example of modern architecture. Its 4000 m^{2} space houses facilities for drama, dance, music and cinema, and its auditorium seats 600 people.
- Municipal library: The municipal library was opened on 23 January 2007. The building has a surface area of 2,204 m^{2}, and is set in 18,000 m^{2} of landscaped open space. The library is in part underground, where ramps connect several levels. The building holds a late-opening quiet area, classrooms and conference rooms, a reading and study room, and an exhibition gallery. The most notable feature of this architectural complex is its outdoor reading park.
- Nuestra Señora del Rosario Church Tower: The original church, dating back three centuries, was not granted protection as a historic monument by the Spanish Ministry of Culture's General Directorate for the Arts (Dirección General de Bellas Artes), and was demolished in 1971 by order of the bishopric. The foundation stone for a new tower was laid in 2005. On 7 October 2010, bells rang in the town for the first time in 38 years. The tower was formally inaugurated on 6 January 2011.
- New town hall of Torre-Pacheco: it was opened in 2011.
- IFEPA: Its name is an acronym that comes from Instituto Ferial de Torre-Pacheco. This huge building is home to several exhibitions and each one usually takes place at the same date every year. It was inaugurated in 1984.
- El tío Facorro windmill: The first documentary reference about this mill dates back to 1833. It has a circle-shaped plan and is 12 metres tall.

=== Local sights ===
- Castillo de Ros: The castle was originally built for the Congregation of Saint Philip Neri, on its estate in the hamlet of Balsicas. It was bought by Antonio Ros de Olano y Perpigná, a soldier stationed in Cartagena, in February 1844. Antonio Ros was later named Viscount Ros de Olano and Marquis of Gaud-el-Yehi by Queen Isabella II. Various alterations were made to the building, known as the Castillo de Ros, by his son and grandson.
- Casa Valderas: This neoclassical leisure property was built in the final years of the 19th century. It is set among gardens and orchards.
- El Pasico shrine: This building was built in the 19th century and is related to a piece about the virgin, which is made of veins of alabaster. There is a religious legend about its appearance.
- El Pasico windmill: Documentary sources mention this windmill to appear in 1844. It has a circle-shaped plan.

== Festivals ==
- The El Pasico Festival is a popular festival held on Easter Monday in association with the El Pasico shrine. A mass celebrated at the shrine is followed by a fair featuring amusement park rides and festivities. In the evening, the traditional mona de Pascua pastry is eaten.
- The Melon Festival was founded by the then mayor of Torre-Pacheco in 1969 to celebrate the melon, first grown in the municipality in the early 20th century.
- International Flamenco Folk Singing Festival: It takes place in Lo Ferrro, which is a little village near Roldán. It is held in the last week of August.
- Patron saint festivity: The reason for the festivity is the Virgin of the Rosary (the virgin in a facet in which she is related to the rosary catholic pray). It occurs in the first half of October. An event which consist in electing three female children and three female teenagers to hold the symbolic role of queen and Dames takes place in the beginning of the festivity and it is named Coronación de reinas y damas. There is also a function for opening the festivity which consist in firing a rocket-shaped firecracker and it is named chupinazo. A choir and dancing festival also occurs in a festive day. A flea market where handcraft elements are for sale is placed during the festive period. A parade also occurs during the festivity. A revere flower placement also takes place. Many other activities are also performed during this period.

=== Festivities in other localities ===
- Patron saint festivity in Roldán: It is held in March and is devoted to Saint Joseph. Some events of the festivity are the coronación de reinas y damas, the chupinazo, a revere flower placement to the patron saint, a parade and a performance of a musical composition named Diana Floreada.
- Patron saint festivity in El Jimenado: It takes place in the first half of September.
- Patron saint festivity in Balsicas: Some events are the coronación de reinas y damas and a flower revere placement to the virgin.

== Notable people ==
- Antonio Ros de Olano (1808–1886): writer, politician, soldier. Antonio Ros fought in the First Carlist War (1833–1840) and in the Hispano-Moroccan War (1859–1860), in which his influence was decisive. He served as Trade Minister in Spain's Ministry of Trade, Education and Public Works, and was made a senator for life in 1877. He also held the 19th-century office of jefe político superior ('senior political chief'), the role of top administrative civil servant of a province of Spain. Antonio Ros was also a founder of Spain's 19th-century Unión Liberal (Liberal Union) party.
- Pedro Cerdán Martínez (1863–1947): architect. Known for designing notable buildings in La Unión, including the Antiguo Mercado Público de La Unión (former public market building).
- Luis Manzanares (1895–1980): writer.
- Alberto Garre López (1952): politician, president of Region of Murcia from 2014 to 2015.
- Gloria Rodríguez Sánchez (1992): road and track cyclist.
