= Region of Murcia =

Autonomous community and province of Spain

Region of Murcia Región de Murcia (Spanish)
- Autonomous community and province
- Flag Coat of arms

- Location of the Region of Murcia in Spain
- Interactive map of Region of Murcia
- Coordinates: 38°00′N 1°50′W
- Country: Spain
- Capital: Murcia

Government
  - Type: Devolved government in a constitutional monarchy
  - President: Fernando López Miras (PP)
  - Legislature: Regional Assembly of Murcia

Area
  - Total: 11,316.17 km^{2} (4,369.20 sq mi)
  - Rank: 9th in Spain (2.2%)

Population (2025)
  - Total: 1,586,989
  - Rank: 10th in Spain (3.2%)
  - Density: 140.2408/km^{2} (363.2221/sq mi)
- Demonym(s): Murcian murciano, -na (Spanish)

GDP
  - Total: €42.488 billion (2024)
  - Per capita: €26,789 (2024)
- ISO 3166 code: ES-MC (region) ES-MU (province)
- Official languages: Spanish
- Congress seats: 10 (of 350)
- Senate seats: 6 (of 265)
- HDI (2022): 0.885 very high · 12th
- Website: Comunidad Autónoma de la Región de Murcia

The Region of Murcia (/ˈmʊərsiə/, US also /ˈmɜːrʃ(i)ə/; Spanish: Región de Murcia [reˈxjon de ˈmuɾθja]; Valencian: Regió de Múrcia) is an autonomous community of Spain located in the southeastern part of the Iberian Peninsula, on the Mediterranean coast. The region has a population of 1,586,989 in an area of 11,316.17 km^{2} (4,369.20 sq mi) as of 2025. About a third of its population lives in the capital, Murcia. Its Mediterranean coastline extends along 258 kilometres (160 mi), alternating beaches, cliffs and rocky shores, in addition to the 73 kilometres (45 mi) of shoreline of the coastal lagoon of Mar Menor. At 2,014 m (6,608 ft), the region's highest point is Los Obispos Peak in the Revolcadores Massif.

A jurisdiction of the Crown of Castile since the Middle Ages, the Kingdom of Murcia was replaced in the 19th century by territory primarily belonging to the provinces of Albacete and Murcia (and subsidiarily to those of Jaén and Alicante). The former two were henceforth attached to a 'historical region' also named after Murcia. The province of Murcia constituted as the full-fledged single-province autonomous community of the Region of Murcia in 1982.

The region is bordered by Andalusia (the provinces of Almería and Granada), Castilla-La Mancha (the province of Albacete), the Valencian Community (province of Alicante), and the Mediterranean Sea. The autonomous community is a single province. The city of Murcia is the capital of the region and the seat of the regional government, but the legislature, known as the Regional Assembly of Murcia, is located in Cartagena. The region is subdivided into municipalities.

The region is among Europe's largest producers of fruits, vegetables, and flowers, with important vineyards in the municipalities of Jumilla, Bullas, and Yecla that produce wines of Denominación de origen. It also has an important tourism sector concentrated on its Mediterranean coastline, which features the Mar Menor saltwater lagoon. Industries include the petrochemical and energy sector (centered in Cartagena) and food production. Because of Murcia's warm climate, the region's long growing season is suitable for agriculture; however, rainfall is low. As a result, in addition to the water needed for crops, there are increasing pressures related to the booming tourist industry. Water is supplied by the Segura River and, since the 1970s, by the Tagus-Segura Water Transfer, a major civil-engineering project that brings water from the Tagus River into the Segura under environmental and sustainability restraints.

Notable features of the region's extensive cultural heritage include 72 cave art ensembles, which are part of the rock art of the Iberian Mediterranean Basin, a World Heritage Site. Other culturally significant features include the Council of Wise Men of the plain of Murcia and the tamboradas (drumming processions) of Moratalla and Mula, which were declared intangible cultural heritage by UNESCO. The region is also the home of Caravaca de la Cruz, a holy city in the Catholic Church that celebrates the Perpetual Jubilee every seven years in the Santuario de la Vera Cruz.

== Etymology and denomination ==
The toponym (place name) Murcia is of uncertain origin. According to Francisco Cascales, it could refer to the Roman goddess Venus Murcia, from the myrtles on the banks of the Segura River. Historical studies conclude that, like the deity, Murcia is of Latin origin deriving most likely from Myrtea or Murtea ('place of myrtles' or 'place where myrtles grow'). Furthermore, Mursiya (already documented in the Islamic period as the name of the city of Murcia), was the adaptation in the Arabic of the pre-existing Latin. According to Bienvenido Mascaray, it is also possible that the name originates from the Iberian language in the form m-ur-zia, meaning 'the water that empowers or moistens.'

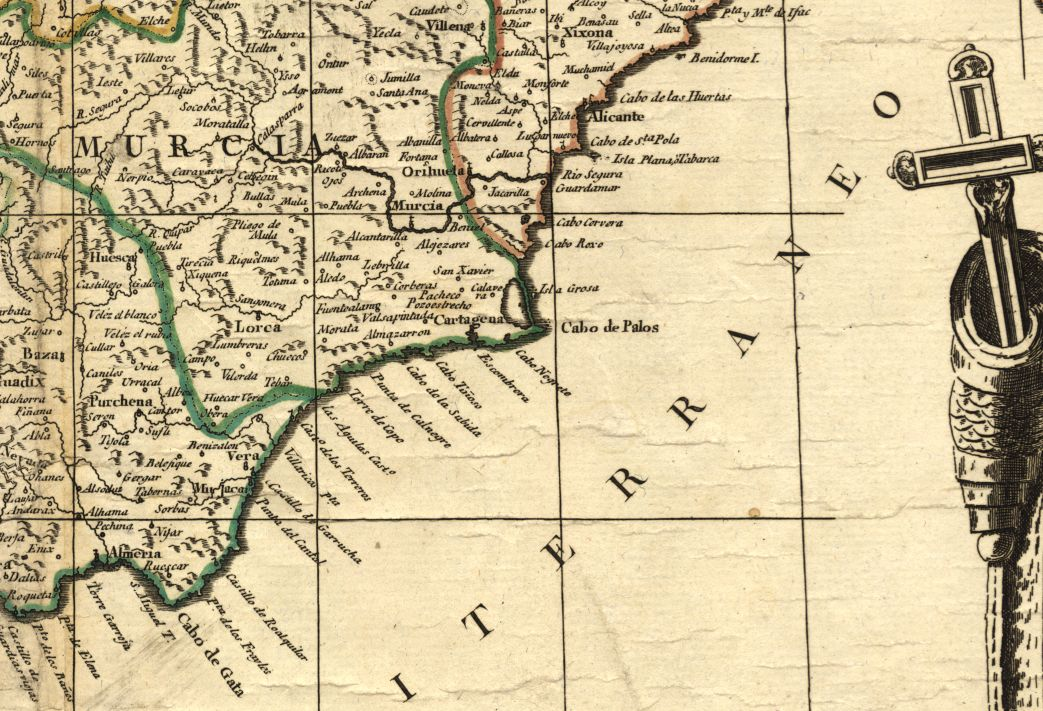
Map of the Kingdom of Murcia in 1795

The use of "Murcia" to define the present region has its origin in the Taifa of Murcia, an Arab kingdom that existed at different times in the 11th, 12th, and 13th centuries. After the Christian conquest of Murcia between 1243 and 1266, the Kingdom of Murcia emerged, a territorial jurisdiction that formed its own institutions until its demise in 1833.

After the provincial administrative reform of 1833, the first Region of Murcia was formed from the provinces of Albacete and Murcia. In the first attempt at decentralization, during the First Republic, this region was one of the 17 member states that were contemplated by the Spanish Draft Constitution of 1873, proclaiming during that year the so-called Cantón Murciano, as an attempt to form a regional canton in the context of the Cantonal rebellion.

In 1978, the Regional Council of Murcia was created as a pre-autonomous body, in effect until 1982, when the Statute of Autonomy of the Region of Murcia was approved. The province of Murcia was then granted autonomy under the official name of the Autonomous Community of the Region of Murcia in the framework of the political process in place during the Spanish transition to democracy.

== History ==
=== Prehistory and Ancient Era ===
Since the Lower Paleolithic era, the Region of Murcia has been inhabited by humans, with Neanderthal remains found in the Sima de las Palomas site in the south east of the region. The Argaric culture one of the most developed cultures of the Metal Ages, flourished into the early Bronze Age, with the site of La Bastida in the southwest of the region being a prominent example. Later, the Iberians were present in this territory during the Middle and Late Bronze Age and remained until very early in ancient history, before the Romans conquered a large part of the Iberian Peninsula.

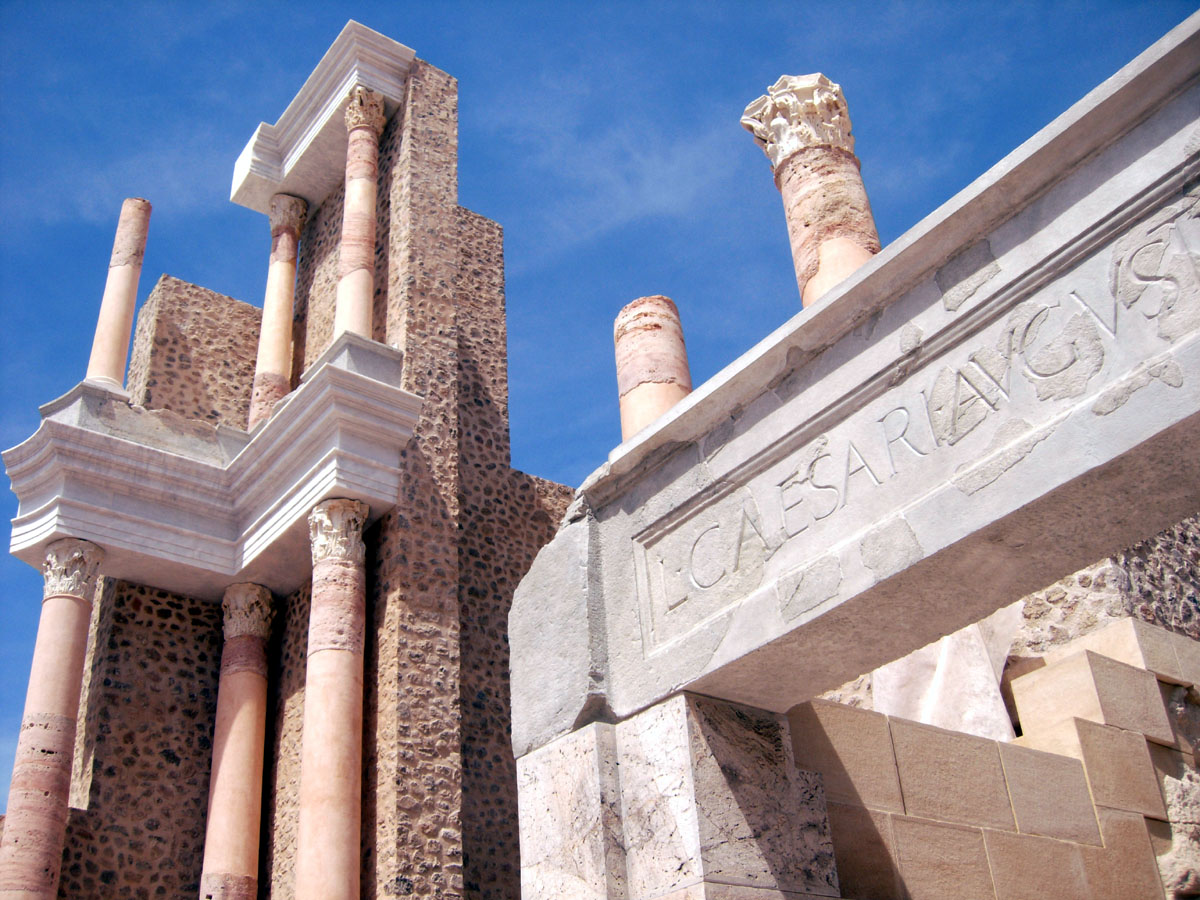
Roman Theatre, Cartagena

In 227 BC, Carthaginians settled in what is now Cartagena with the mountainous territory merely the hinterland of their seacoast empire although in 209 BC it was conquered by the Romans and was incorporated into the province of Hispania Carthaginensis. During the Roman era, Carthago Nova was the most important place in the region, and there are still remains of ancient villas in the Campo de Cartagena. The Romans built a salt factory and settled in a little town called Ficaria, in the current municipality of Mazarrón. Altiplano and Noroeste comarcas (a kind of region) both contain surviving dwellings of the Romans.

In the early 5th century, the Vandals together with the Suebi and Alans invaded the Iberian Peninsula with the Vandals settling in the region. The Roman Empire successfully proposed an alliance with the Visigoths to recover its lost Spanish land in return for goods and territory. The Vandals fled to North Africa and the Visigoths federated to the Roman Empire in a kingdom that stretched from Gibraltar to the Loire River. The Visigothic kingdom became independent of the Roman Empire in 476.

In 555 AD, the Byzantines, under the emperor Justinian the Great, conquered the southeastern coast of the Iberian Peninsula and established the province of Spania. Part of the current Region of Murcia belonged to the province and therefore to the Eastern Roman or Byzantine Empire. The current of Campo Cartagena-Mar Menor (Cartagena, La Unión, Fuente Álamo, Torre-Pacheco, Los Alcázares, Mazarrón) and Alto Guadalentín (Lorca, Águilas, San Javier and Santiago de la Ribera, and Puerto Lumbreras) also belonged to the province.

=== Moorish Middle Ages ===
In the early 8th century there was a disputed succession to the Visigothic throne. The king Wittiza wanted his son Agila to be his successor, but the nobles of the court elected Roderic, duke of Baetica, as king. The people in favour of Agila conspired to overthrow Roderic. They asked the Moors for help and promised spoils of war in return.

The Moors began conquering the Iberian Peninsula in 711. Roderic was killed, and the Visigothic kingdom disappeared. Consequently, the Moors quickly conquered much of the peninsula.

Theodemir led a nucleus of resistance in almost all the current region and the south of Alicante province. In 713, he signed the Treaty of Orihuela, because the resistance could no longer endure. The territory came under Muslim rule, but the conquerors granted it political autonomy.

Under the Moors, who introduced the large-scale irrigation upon which Murcian agriculture relies, the province was known as Todmir. According to Idrisi, the 12th century Arab cartographer based in Sicily, it included the cities of Orihuela, Lorca, Mula, and Chinchilla.

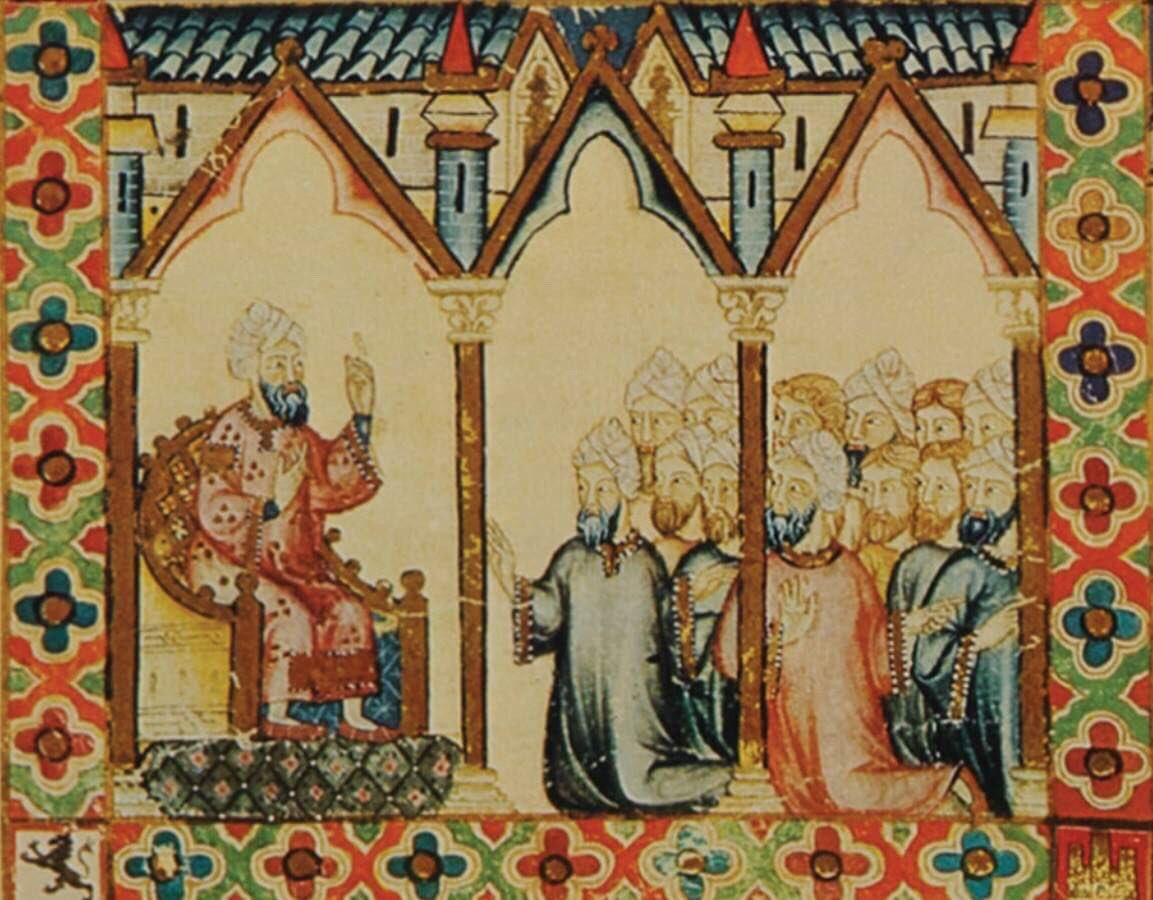
Ibn Hud as depicted in the Cantigas de Santa Maria

In the early 11th century, after the fall of the Umayyad Caliphate of Córdoba, a territory centered on the city of Murcia became an independent principality, or taifa. At one point, the taifa included parts of the present-day provinces of Albacete and Almería, as well.

After the 1086 Battle of Sagrajas, the Almoravid emirate swallowed up the taifas. When Almoravid rule ultimately declined, Abu ʿAbd Allāh Muḥammad ibn Saʿd ibn Mardanīš established a taifa—including the cities of Murcia, Valencia, and Dénia—that opposed for a time the spread of the Almohads, but ultimately succumbed to the latter's advance in the 1170s. Conversely, when the Almohads receded after their defeat in the 1212 Battle of Las Navas de Tolosa, another taifa-prince based in Murcia, Ibn Hud, rebelled against Almohad rule and briefly controlled most of Al-Andalus.

=== Christian Middle Ages and early modern period ===
Ferdinand III of Castile received the submission of the Moorish king of Murcia under the terms of the 1243 Treaty of Alcaraz and made the territory a protectorate of the Crown of Castile. There were towns that rejected compliance with the treaty, such as Qartayanna-Al halfa (Cartagena), Lurqa (Lorca) and Mula. There were also towns where governors accepted the treaty but the inhabitants did not, such as Aledo, Ricote, Uruyla (Orihuela), and Medina La-Quant (Alicante), (although the two last do not belong to the present-day Region of Murcia; they were part of the Taifa of Murcia). In 1245, a Castilian army and a fleet from the Cantabrian Sea conquered Qartayanna. Consequently, the rest of the rebellious towns were also taken by the Castilians. Following the support of local Muslims for the Mudéjar revolt of 1264–1266, in 1266 Alfonso X of Castile annexed the territory outright with critical military support from his uncle Jaime I of Aragon.

The Castilian conquest of Murcia marked the end of the Aragon's southward expansion along the Iberian Mediterranean coast. The kingdom of Murcia was repopulated with people from Christian territories by giving them land.

James II of Aragon broke an agreement between the Castile and Aragon regarding the division of territory between the two kingdoms and, from 1296 to 1302, conquered Alicante, Elche, Orihuela, Murcia, Cartagena, and Lorca. In consequence of those victories, James II and Ferdinand IV of Castile agreed to the Treaty of Torrellas, which stipulated the return of the conquered territory to Castile, save for the towns of Cartagena, Orihuela, Elche, and Alicante. In 1305, Cartagena was returned to Castile. The kingdom of Murcia lost the territory of the current province of Alicante.

The Castilian monarchs proceeded to delegate power over the whole Kingdom of Murcia (then a borderland of the Crown of Castile, near Granada and Aragon) to a senior officer called the Adelantado. The kingdom of Murcia was divided into religious manors, nobility manors, and señoríos de realengo (a type of manorialism in which the noble had the property, but the king had the authority to administer justice). There were two noble lineages during the Late Middle Ages and the modern period: Los Manueles and Los Fajardos.

The Kingdom of Murcia was adjacent to the Emirate of Granada, which provoked several Muslim raids and wars that occurred mainly during the 15th century.

Map of the Kingdom of Murcia in 1590

In the early 16th century, the population increased in the Kingdom of Murcia. There were three plague epidemics during the century, but they did not severely affect the region. In the first third of the century, the Revolt of the Comuneros occurred. Some places that supported the revolt were towns in the present-day Castile and León and Castilla-La Mancha regions. In the Kingdom of Murcia, the revolutionary towns were Murcia, Cartagena, Lorca, Caravaca, Cehegín, and Totana. The castle of Aledo defended the monarchy. In 1521, the Revolt of the Comuneros was defeated.

In the early 17th century, King Philip III of Spain expelled all the Moriscos (descendants of Muslims) from Valencia, Aragon, and Castille. During this century, two plague epidemics also occurred.

During the 18th century, Francisco Salzillo was a notable Baroque artist in the Kingdom of Murcia. He made carvings with religious imagery.

=== Napoleonic wars ===
In 1807, Napoleon signed the Treaty of Fontainebleau with Spain, in order for French armies to cross the peninsula to conquer Portugal. In early 1808, Napoleon betrayed Spain and invaded Pamplona, San Sebastián, Barcelona, Burgos, and Salamanca. In 1808, the people of Madrid rebelled, and all of Spain was summoned to fight the French invaders. The people of the country established for each province political organisations, or juntas, as alternatives to the official administrations. Since the French were not much present in the Kingdom of Murcia, battles were rare in the region. Nevertheless, Spaniards from the region battled the French in other areas of Spain. In addition, the region became a staging area for the movement of troops, guns, and supplies destined for the eastern Iberian Peninsula, or Andalucía. In 1810, French troops did attack the Kingdom of Murcia. Most local officials escaped. The French, coming from Lorca, invaded the town of Murcia on 23 April, and looted it on the 26th. The troops returned to the town in August, but defensive measures had been taken and the French attack was repelled. The French army occupied Murcia again in January 1812, looting Águilas, Lorca, Caravaca, Cehegín, Jumilla, Yecla, Mula, Alhama de Murcia, and the Ricote Valley. Cartagena withstood a French siege, owing to its rampart and the help of an English fleet. In 1813, the French were decisively defeated in the north at the Battle of Vitoria.

=== 20th century ===
In 1936, under the Second Spanish Republic, there was an uprising. The North African territories of Spain were taken on 17 July. The uprising was successful in some areas of Spain. The partial success of the uprising brought on the Spanish Civil War. The province of Murcia supported the Popular Front (the governing party in that era). The port of Cartagena became the main base of the Republican navy and was home to destroyer, cruiser, and submarine fleets. Thus, the Region of Murcia was of geostrategic importance during the war. To defend Cartagena, there were anti-aircraft bases throughout the region. The region was not near the frontlines and overall it was not attacked, except from the air against Cartagena and Águilas. Large factories, basic services, and some other properties were seized by trade unions. There was an impoverishment among the inhabitants and a lack of food supplies. Consequently, rationing was established in the region.

Under Francoist Spain, wine agriculture and economic activities increased in the Altiplano comarca (north of the region). An oil refinery infrastructure was established in Cartagena in 1942, and power refineries, supply refineries, and factories were constructed in the same area during the 1950s and 1960s.

Murcia became an autonomous region in 1982.

Massive riots erupted in Cartagena in 1992 protesting against the closing down of shipbuilding, mining and chemical companies and the regional legislature building was set on fire.

== Geography ==
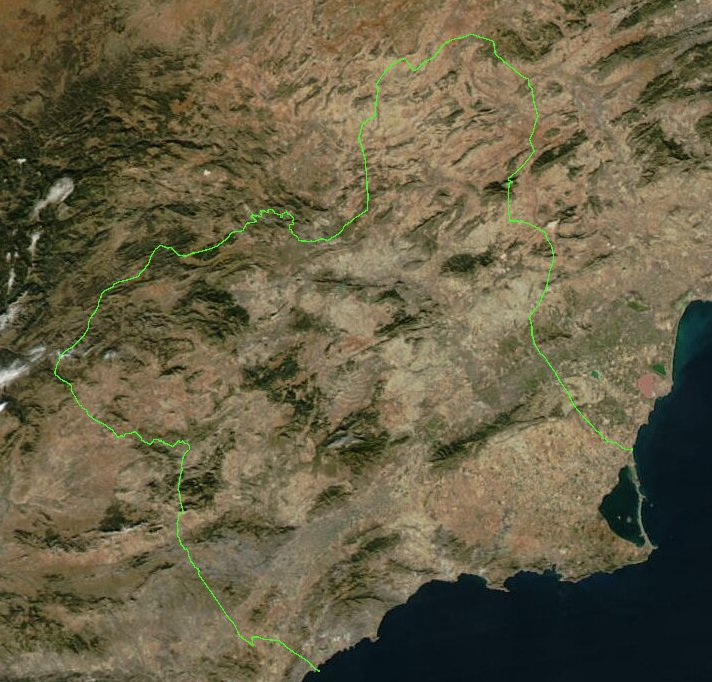
Satellite view of the Region of Murcia.

The Region of Murcia is located in the southeast of the Iberian Peninsula, on the coast of the Mediterranean Sea. It ranges from 38º 45' in the north to 37º 23' in the south, and from 0º 41' in the east to 2º 21' in the west. With an area of 11,313 square kilometres (4,368 sq mi), it is the ninth-largest region of Spain by area and constitutes 2.9% of the national area. It extends over the greater part of the hydrographic basin of the Segura River, thus constituting a well-defined geographical unit, except for the comarcas of the Sierra de Segura and the Campos de Hellín which were in the province of Albacete, Los Vélez in Almería and La Vega Baja in the province of Alicante, all belonging to the same basin.

=== Terrain ===
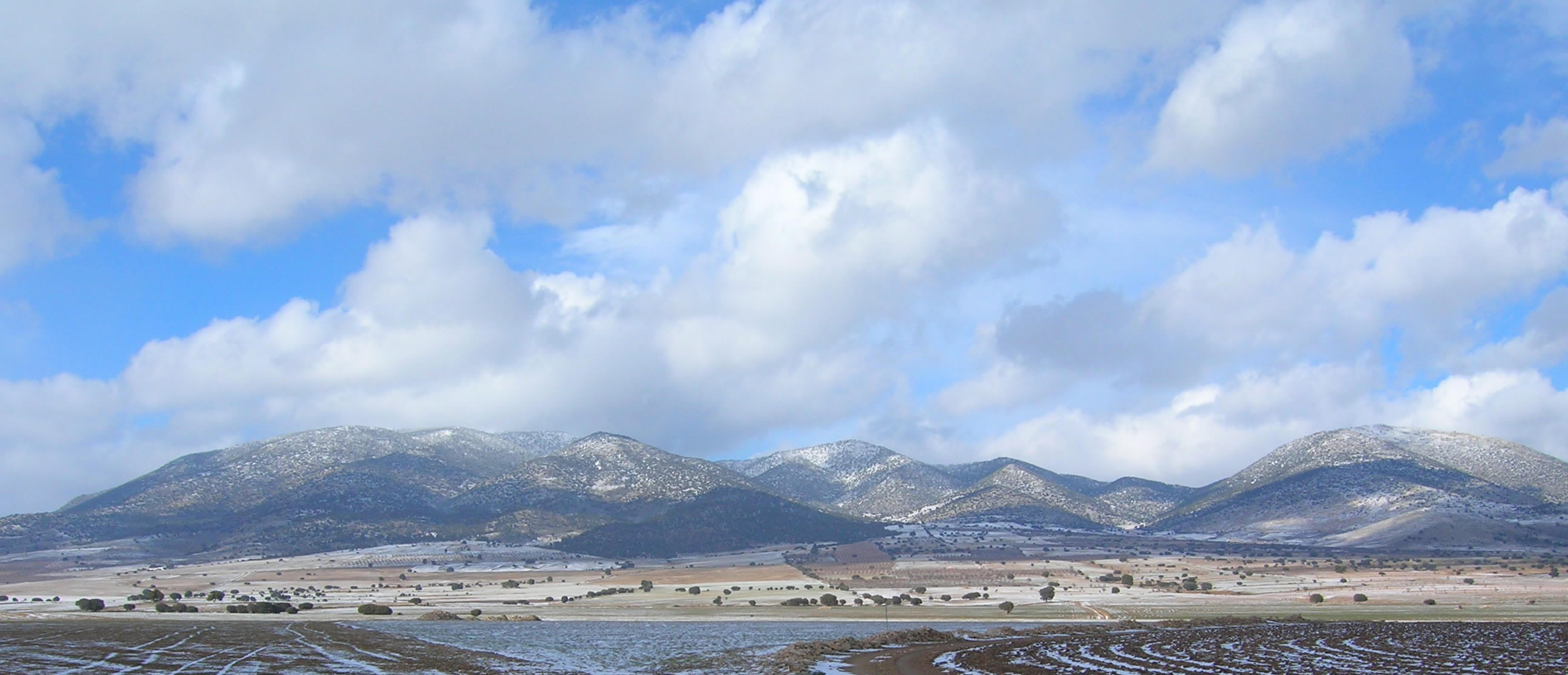
The Massif of Revolcadores is the highest point of the Region of Murcia, its highest peak is Los Obispos Peak at 2,014 metres (6,608 ft).

Approximately 27% of the Murcian territory consists of mountainous reliefs, 38% intermountain depressions and corridor valleys, and the remaining 35% of plains and high plateaus. The region is located at the eastern end of the Baetic System, being affected climatologically by an orography that isolates it from the Atlantic influence. These mountain ranges are divided in turn from north to south into:

- the Cordillera Prebética: the northernmost, where the Sierra del Carche stands out from the others.
- the Cordillera Subbética: it consists of numerous dipping faults superimposed on each other or on the materials of the Prebaetic. The Massif of Revolcadores, the highest in the region at 2,015 metres (6,611 ft), belongs to this system.
- the Cordillera Penibética: with three distinct lithological complexes from north to south (Nevado-Filabride, Alpujárride and Maláguide). They are very fractured, although there is a predominance of dipping faults and inverse faults between these complexes. Sierra Espuña is one of the fundamental penibaetic mountains.

Among the high plateaus are the Campo de San Juan and the Altiplano murciano.

Some of the valleys and plains are the coastal depression of the Campo de Cartagena-Mar Menor; a little farther inland is the Valle del Guadalentín (also called the Murcian pre-coastal depression), which crosses the region from southwest to northeast. The fertile plains lie along the Segura River (among the most famous ones the so-called Valle de Ricote), and tributaries of the Segura, such as the Mula basin.

To explain this complex relief, it is important to highlight the existence of significant faults throughout the area—such as Alhama de Murcia, Bullas-Archena, or the Cicatriz Nor-Bética—which, along with intersections with other minor faults, generate numerous earth movements, such as the 2011 Lorca earthquake.

The most widely present soil types are the calcaric fluvisol, the calcaric regosol, and the calcic xerosol. Regosol soils form about a quarter of the region's surface; and calcic horizons (B horizons [third layers of the soil] being formed by calcium carbonate deposits and 15 cm thick at least, and containing a minimum 15% of CaCO_{3} besides more features) occur in almost half of the surface.

=== Climate ===
Murcia predominantly has a hot semi-arid climate (Köppen climate classification: BSh) and a cold semi-arid climate (Köppen: BSk). However, parts of the southern coast of Murcia have a hot desert climate (Köppen: BWh). In addition, there are small areas in the interior that have a cold desert climate (BWk), a hot summer Mediterranean climate (Csa) and, to a lesser extent, a warm summer Mediterranean climate (Csb).

Winters are mild (an average of 11 °C (52 °F) in December and January) and summers are hot to very hot (where the daily maximum regularly exceeds 40 °C (104 °F)). The average annual temperature varies from 10 °C (50 °F) to more than 19 °C (66 °F).

Precipitation varies from more than 600 millimetres (24 in) to less than 200 millimetres (7.9 in) per year, making this autonomous community the driest in Spain. The region has between 120 and 150 days in the year where the sky is totally clear. April and October have the most precipitation, with frequent heavy downpours in a single day.

The distance to the sea and the relief causes a thermal difference between the coast and the interior, especially in winter, when the temperature rarely dips below 10 °C (50 °F) on the coast, while in the interior regions the minimum usually does not rise above 6 °C (43 °F) and the precipitation level is higher (up to 600 millimetres (24 in)).

The city of Murcia holds the Spanish record high temperature in the 20th century. It reached 46.1 °C (115.0 °F) on 4 July 1994. The winter of 2005 was the coldest in a long time, with snow falling even on the Murcian coast.

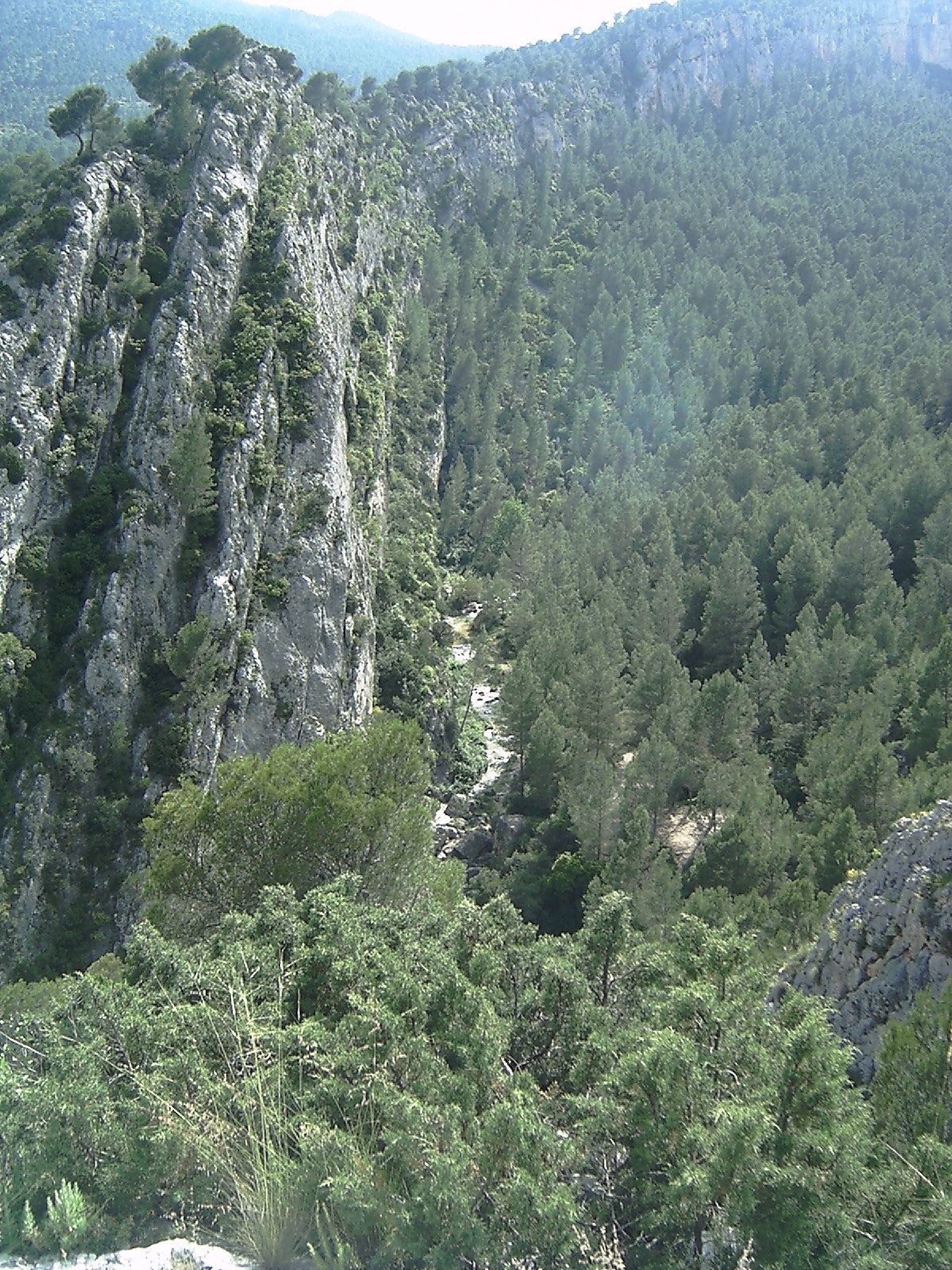
Lands around Moratalla and river Alharabe.

=== Hydrography ===
==== Rivers ====
The region's hydrographic network consists mainly of the Segura river and its tributaries:

- the Mundo River, which originates in Albacete); it contributes the greatest volume to the Segura.
- the Alhárabe River and its tributary the Benamor.
- the Mula River.
- the Guadalentín, Sangonera or Reguerón (which originates above Lorca).

Due to the Segura river basin's insufficient water capacity, contributions to this river basin are made from the basin of the Tajo River by means of the Tajo–Segura Water Transfer.

==== Seas ====
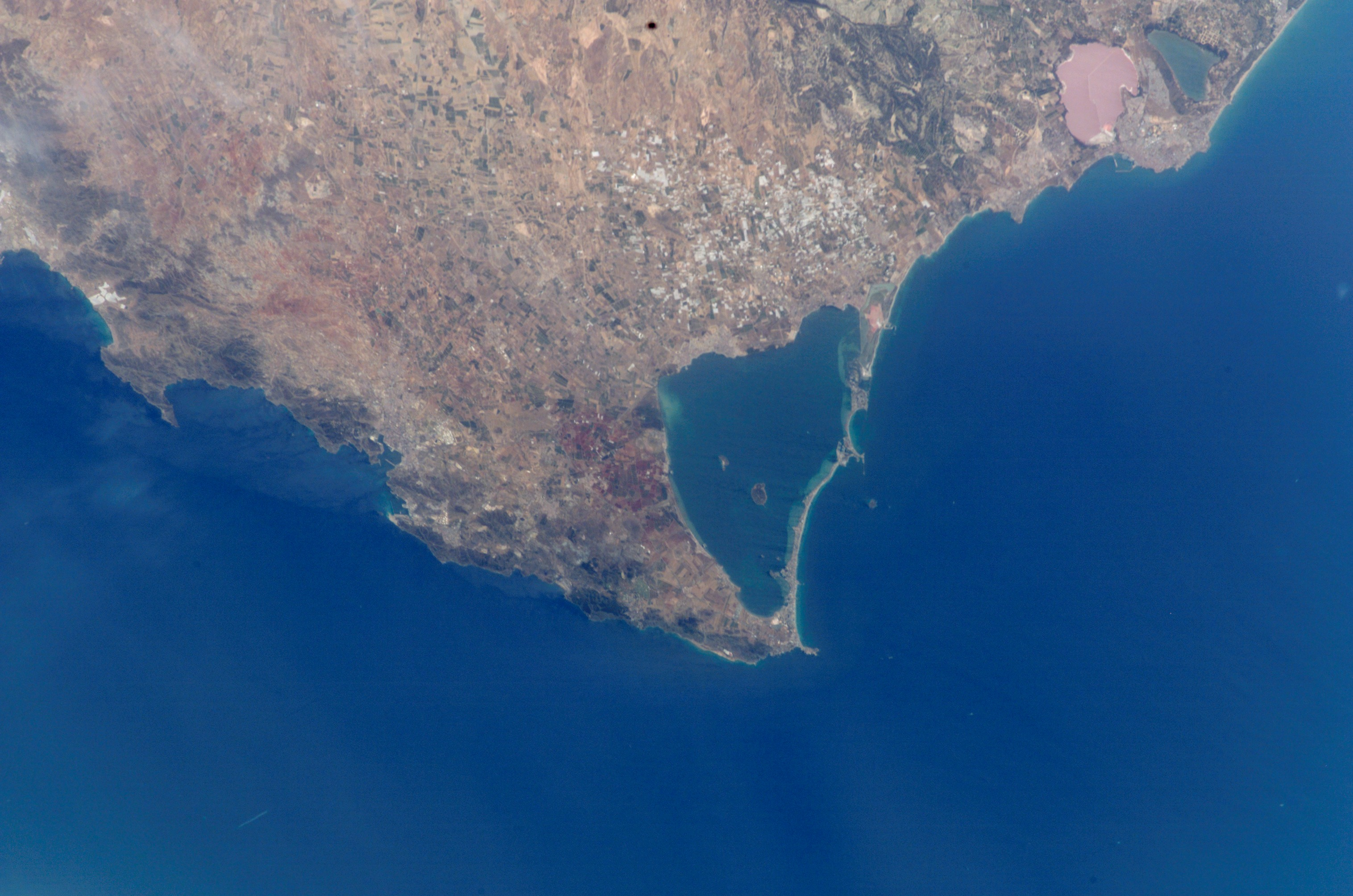
Satellite view of the Mar Menor

The greatest natural lake of Spain can be found in the region: the Mar Menor (Small Sea) lagoon. It is a salt water lagoon, adjacent to the Mediterranean Sea. Its special ecological and natural characteristics make the Mar Menor a unique place and the largest saltwater lake in Europe. With a semicircular shape, it is separated from the Mediterranean Sea by a sand strip 22 kilometres (14 mi) in length and between 100 and 1,200 metres (330 and 3,940 ft) wide, which is known as La Manga del Mar Menor (the Minor Sea's Sandbar). The lagoon has been designated by the United Nations as a Specially Protected Zone of Importance for the Mediterranean. Its coastal perimeter accounts for 73 kilometres (45 mi) of coast, along which beaches follow one another beside crystal clear shallow water (the maximum depth does not exceed 7 metres (23 ft)). The lake has an area of 170 square kilometres (66 sq mi).

=== Flora and fauna ===
==== Flora ====
There are more than 30 tree species, over 50 species of shrubs, and more than 130 herbaceous plant species in the region. Some species have been introduced but are now part of the landscape.

Indigenous tree species in the region are Aleppo pines, Mediterranean buckthorns, tamarisk trees, and field elms. There are also some species that have been introduced, such as the Mediterranean cypress.

Native shrubs found in several parts of the region are esparto grass, a species of the genus European fan palm, Salsola genistoides (close to the opposite-leaved saltworts), rosemary, lentisks, black hawthorns, Neptune grass, shaggy sparrow-wort, and Retama sphareocarpa. There are also species which have been introduced, such as the tree tobacco and Opuntia maxima.

In regards to herbaceous plants, some native species are slender sowthistles, false sowthistles, mallow bindweeds, wall barleys, fennels, Brachypodium retusum (close to false-bromes), Thymus hyemalis (close to broad-leaved thymes), Asphodelus ayardii (of the same genus as onionweeds). Non-native species include the African wood-sorrel and the flax-leaf fleabane.

==== Fauna ====
In the region, there are over 10 species of land mammals (not counting bats), 19 bat species, over 80 bird species, 11 species of amphibians, 21 reptile species, and 9 species of fish.

Mammals inhabiting the area include barbary sheep, European badgers, beech martens, Eurasian otters, red foxes, wild boars, red squirrels, European wildcats, garden dormice, and Cabreras vole (of the same genus as field voles). In addition, some species of bats are the common pipistrelle, Kukhl's pipistrelle, the common bent-wing bat, the soprano pipistrelle, the greater horseshoe bat, the meridional serotine (which only inhabits southern Spain, Morocco, Algeria and Tunisia), the lesser horseshoe bat, and the European free-tailed bat.

In regard to birds, there are some raptor species, such as Bonelli's eagles, golden eagles, peregrine falcons, little owls, and Eurasian eagle-owls. There are also waterbirds, such as yellow-legged gulls, mallards, black-winged stilts, little grebes, and garganeys. Other bird species are the house sparrow, European greenfinch, European robins, common blackbirds, and European turtle doves.

Some amphibians found in the Region of Murcia are Perez's frog, common parsley frog, European toads, and Natterjack toads.

Reptile species in the region are Montpellier snakes, ladder snakes, horseshoe whip snakes, viperine water snakes, Iberian worm lizards, Spanish pond turtles, Iberian wall lizards, Spanish psammodromus, Tarentola mauritanica, loggerhead sea turtles, and Greek tortoises.

Fish species in the region include the Atlantic horse mackerel, Spanish toothcarp, gilt-head bream, greater amberjack, sand steenbras, and flathead grey mullet.

== Symbols ==
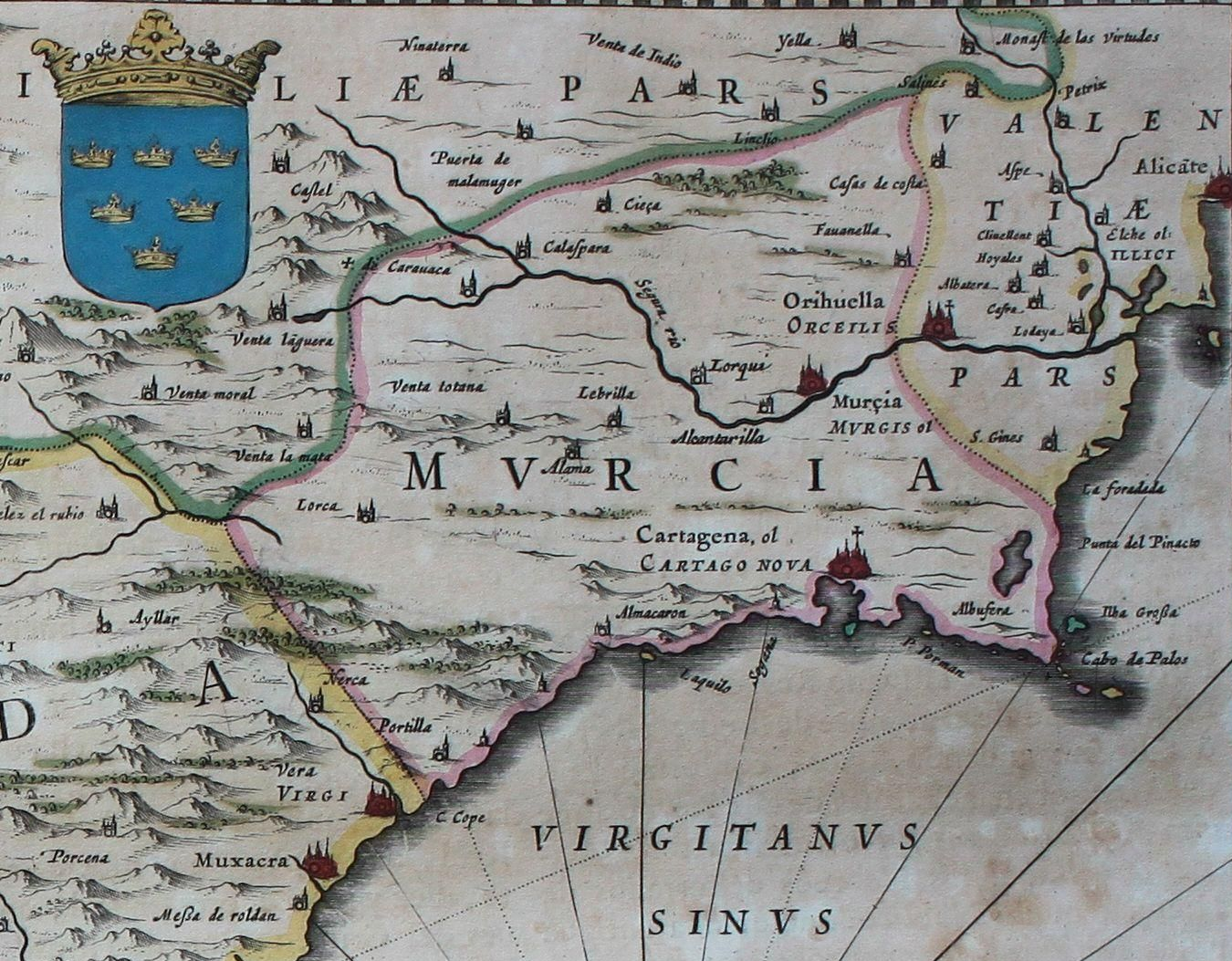
Map of the Kingdom of Murcia in La Geographia Blaviana by Joan Blaeu (1659). In the upper left quadrant appears the coat of arms of the kingdom, which was included in the flag and coat of arms of the Region of Murcia.

The flag of the Region of Murcia is rectangular and contains four castle battlements in gold in the upper hoist canton, distributed two over two (symbolizing the borders of the ancient Kingdom of Murcia and the four borders that it had at some point in its history), and seven royal crowns in the lower fly canton (these being the escutcheon of the historical coat of arms of the Kingdom of Murcia), arranged in four rows, with one, three, two and one elements, respectively; all on the crimson background of Cartagena.

The flag's origin dates back to the Spanish transition, when the president of the Regional Council of Murcia, Antonio Pérez Crespo, established a commission in 1978 to study the future flag of the Region of Murcia. The commission was formed by historians Juan Torres Fontes and José María Jover and senators Ricardo de la Cierva and Antonio López Pina. The project was approved on 26 March 1979 and the flag was first hoisted on 5 May 1979 on a balcony of the Regional Council building, the former Provincial Council of Murcia (now the Ministry of Finance).

The same committee established that the coat of arms of the Region of Murcia had the same symbols and distribution as the flag, with the royal crown as a crest above. Flag and shield were specified by Article 4 of the Statute of Autonomy of the Region of Murcia, approved by organic law in 1982.

The Day of the Region of Murcia is celebrated on 9 June, commemorating the promulgation of the Statute of Autonomy.

== Administrative divisions ==
Municipalities in Region of Murcia

The Region of Murcia has 45 municipalities:

- Abanilla
- Abarán
- Águilas
- Albudeite
- Alcantarilla
- Los Alcázares
- Aledo
- Alguazas
- Alhama de Murcia
- Archena
- Beniel
- Blanca
- Bullas
- Calasparra
- Campos del Río
- Caravaca de la Cruz
- Cartagena
- Cehegín
- Ceutí
- Cieza
- Fortuna
- Fuente Álamo de Murcia
- Jumilla
- Librilla
- Lorca
- Lorquí
- Mazarrón
- Molina de Segura
- Moratalla
- Mula
- Murcia
- Ojós
- Pliego
- Puerto Lumbreras
- Ricote
- San Javier
- San Pedro del Pinatar
- Santomera
- Torre-Pacheco
- Las Torres de Cotillas
- Totana
- Ulea
- La Unión
- Villanueva del Río Segura
- Yecla

== Demographics ==
Historical population
Year	Pop.	±%
1842	368,259	—
1857	379,969	+3.2%
1877	452,082	+19.0%
1887	489,667	+8.3%
1900	581,455	+18.7%
1910	620,926	+6.8%
1920	654,436	+5.4%
1930	651,979	−0.4%
1940	731,221	+12.2%
1950	755,850	+3.4%
1960	803,086	+6.2%
1970	832,047	+3.6%
1981	955,487	+14.8%
1991	1,045,601	+9.4%
2001	1,197,646	+14.5%
2011	1,462,128	+22.1%
2021	1,518,279	+3.8%
Source: INE

As of 2025, the population is 1,586,989, of which 50.1% are male, and 49.9% are female. Minors make up 19.1% of the population, and seniors make up 17.0%.

30.1% of the region's population lives in the capital and largest city, Murcia, with another 13.9% living in Cartagena.

=== Religion ===
Roman Catholicism is, by far, the largest religion in the Region of Murcia. In 2019, 80.1% of Murcians identified themselves as Roman Catholic.

Religion in Murcia (2019)
1. Practicing Catholic (26.6%)
2. Non-practicing Catholic (53.5%)
3. Believer in another religion (2.10%)
4. Agnostic (5.60%)
5. Indifferent/Non-believer (4.60%)
6. Atheism (7.70%)

=== Languages ===
The Spanish spoken in the region has its own accent and local vocabulary. The Murcian dialect is one of the southern dialects of Spanish and tends to eliminate many syllable-final consonants and emphasizes regional vocabulary, much of which is derived from Aragonese, Catalan, and Arabic words. The general intonation and some of the distinctive vocabulary of the Murcian dialect share several traits with the dialects spoken in the neighboring province of Almería, north of Granada, and the Vega Baja del Segura, in the Alicante province.

The Valencian language is spoken in a small area of the region known as El Carche.

=== Immigration ===
Foreign-born population (2025)
Country of birth	Population
Morocco	102,930
Ecuador	42,446
Colombia	23,722
United Kingdom	16,534
Bolivia	12,612
France	10,024
Ukraine	9,480
Romania	8,657
Venezuela	8,629
Argentina	5,557
Nicaragua	4,948
Honduras	4,866
Paraguay	4,661
Algeria	4,115
Cuba	3,947

As of 2025, immigrants make up 20.4% of the population. The 5 largest foreign countries of birth are Morocco, Ecuador, Colombia, the United Kingdom, and Bolivia.

== Economy ==
The Gross domestic product (GDP) of the autonomous region was 31.5 billion euros in 2018, accounting for 2.6% of Spanish economic output. GDP per capita, adjusted for purchasing power, was 22,800 euros, or 76% of the EU27 average in the same year. The GDP per employee was 84% of the EU average.

Agriculture, ranching, and fishing contributed 5.99% of Region of Murcia's Gross Value Added (GVA). Extraction industries, manufacturing industries, and several power supply activities constituted 18.32% of the GVA. The tourism sector provided 11.4% of regional GDP in 2018.

35.9% of the land in the region is given to arable farming. Major crops grown are oat, barley, lettuce, citrus fruits, peaches, almonds, apricots, olives, and grapes. It is common to find Murcia's tomatoes and lettuce, lemons, and oranges in European supermarkets. Murcia is a producer of wines, with about 29,000 hectares (72,000 acres) devoted to grape vineyards. Most of the vineyards are located in Jumilla and Yecla. Jumilla is on a plateau where the vineyards are surrounded by mountains. Migrant workers are used in the agriculture industry. In regards to fishing sector, the most caught species are anchovies, round sardinellas, sardines, chub mackerels, gilt-head breams, and pompanoes. Aquaculture breeds Atlantic bluefin tuna, gilt-head breams, and sea bass.

Murcia has some industry, with foreign companies choosing it as a location for factories, such as Henry Milward & Sons (which manufactures surgical and knitting needles) and American firms such as General Electric and Paramount Park Studios.

During the 2000s, the economy of the region turned towards "residential tourism", in which people from northern European countries have a second home in the area. Europeans and Americans are able to learn Spanish in the academies in the town center.

=== Tourism ===
The Region of Murcia receives fewer tourists than the rest of Spanish Mediterranean coast. Nevertheless, its more than 300 sunny days a year with an average temperature of 21 °C (70 °F), and the 250 kilometres (160 mi) of beaches of the so-called Costa Cálida (Warm Coast) have attracted tourists for decades.

The region is also being promoted as a cultural destination with many highlights for visitors: monuments, gastronomy, cultural events, museums, historic remains, festivals, etc. The region is one of the Spanish autonomous communities that have grown the most in the last few years, and this has conferred on it the character of an ideal destination for services, shopping, cultural events, and conventions.

==== Cultural tourism ====
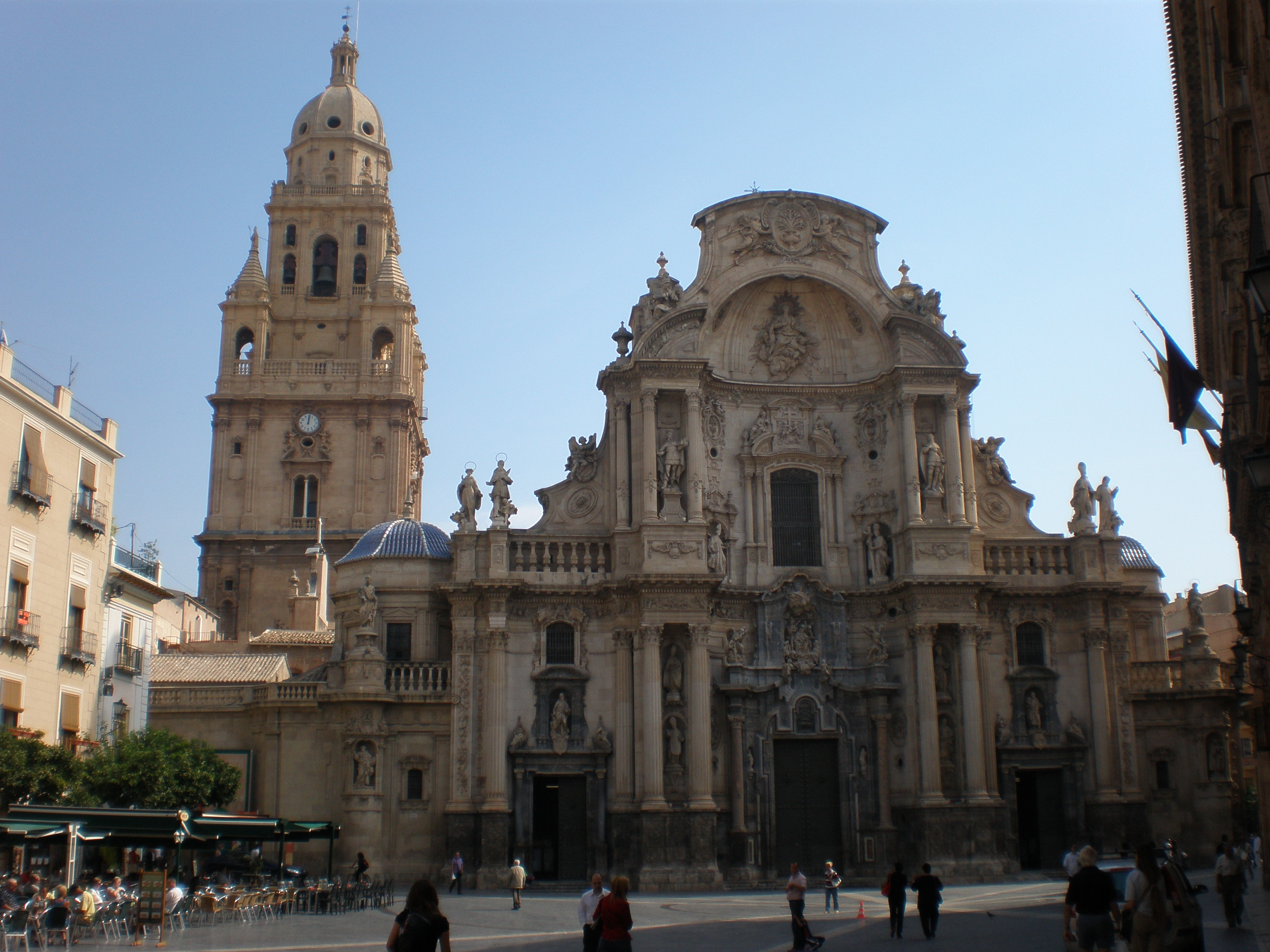
Murcia Cathedral.

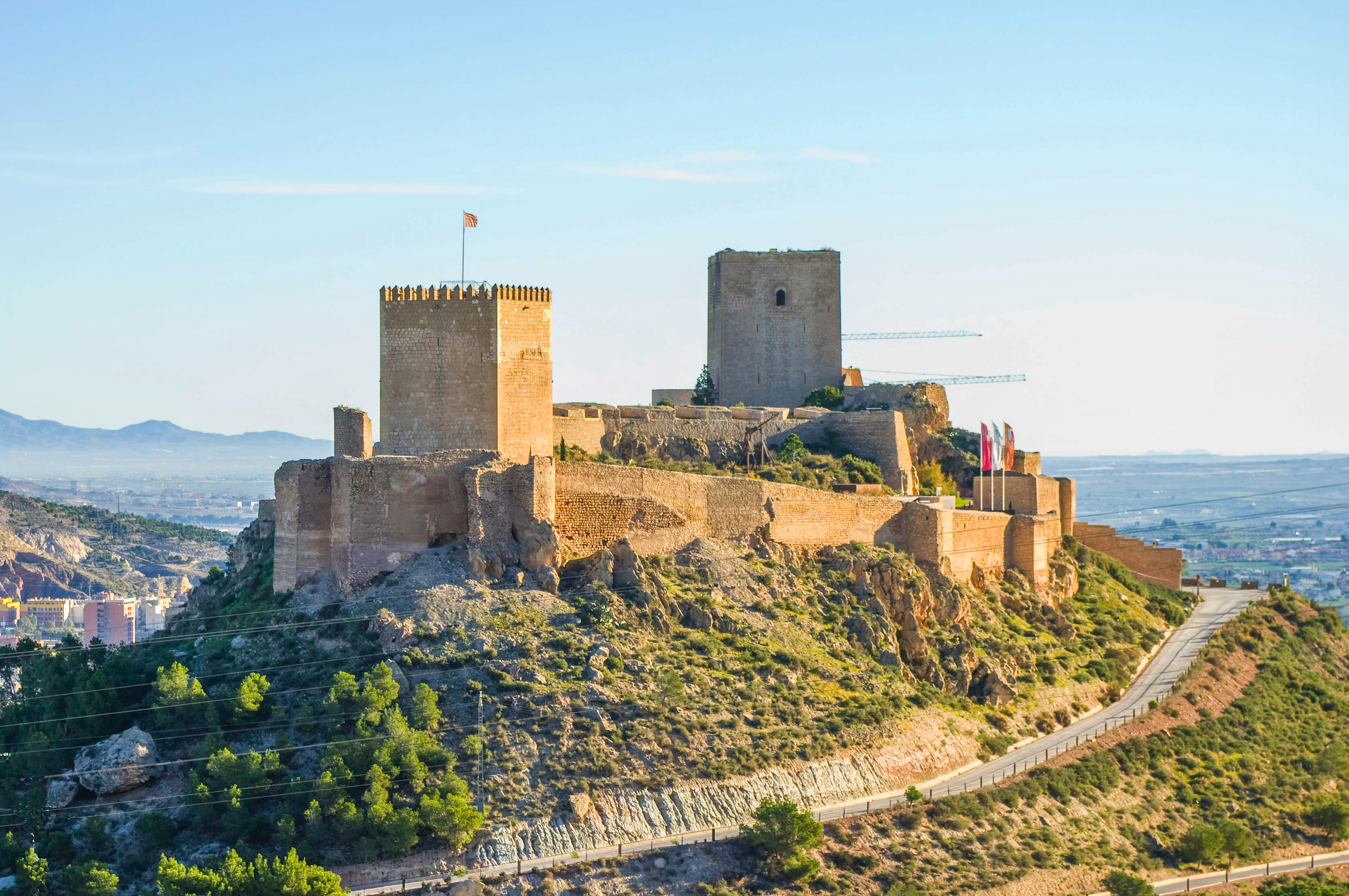
Castle of Lorca

===== Major tourist destinations =====
The most visited towns are:

- Murcia, the capital city, offers the facilities of a large city. It is the seventh-largest Spanish city by population with approximately 440,000 inhabitants in 2009. Murcia's sights include its famous cathedral with its 90-metre (300 ft) tall bell tower. Murcia is also a large university town with more than 30,000 students per year. It has more than 2 million m^{2} of parks and gardens. Murcia has a rich history tied to the Jewish community.
- Cartagena is the region's second-largest city and one of the main Spanish naval bases. Sights include its recently restored Roman Theatre (among numerous Roman remains), a number of modernist buildings and many military fortifications.
- Lorca is a large medieval town at the foothills upon which its famous castle stands. It is the second-largest municipality of Spain in area.
- Caravaca de la Cruz, or simply Caravaca, is one of the five official Holy cities for Catholicism since it is claimed to house part of the Lignum Crucis, the Holy Cross.

===== The castles itinerary =====
The interior of the Region of Murcia has plenty of castles and fortifications that show the importance of these frontier lands between the Christian Castile and the Muslim Andalusia. They include:

- Castle of Jumilla, a former Roman fortification turned by the Moors into an Alcazaba. The Castilian kings and the marquesses of Villena gave it its appearance of a Gothic royal residence.
- Castle of Moratalla, one of the largest castles of the province, built to defend the town of Moratalla from invaders from the nearby Muslim Kingdom of Granada.
- Castle of Mula, of Muslim origin, but as with many castles, eventually restored and renovated.
- Royal Alcázar of Caravaca de la Cruz, where the Holy sanctuary was built, also of Moorish origin, conquered by the Christians and finally home to several noble families.
- Concepción Castle, in Cartagena, built on one of the five hills of the old Cartagena, following the Roman taste. Now it is home of the Centre for the Interpretation of the History of Cartagena.
- Lorca Castle, also known as the Fortress of the Sun.

===== Festivals =====
Cartagena's and Lorca's Holy Week processions have been declared of International Tourist Interest, together with Murcia's Bando de la Huerta and "The Burial of the Sardine in Murcia", included in its spring festivities. Murcia's Holy Week is also interesting since its processions include statues by Murcian sculptor Francisco Salzillo.

Cartagena's main festivities are the Carthagineses y Romanos, re-enacting the Punic Wars. They have been declared of National Tourist Interest.

Águila's Carnival is one of the most important and colourful festival in Spain.

==== Beaches and golf ====
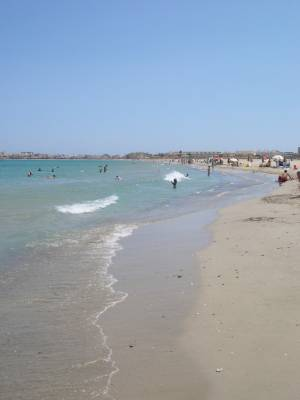
La Manga del Mar Menor

The Costa Cálida has 250 kilometres (160 mi) of beaches, from El Mojón, in the north near Alicante, to Águilas, in southwest Murcia near Almería.

One of the major destinations of Murcia is the Mar Menor or Small Sea, located on the Mediterranean. It is the largest natural lake in Spain and the largest salty lagoon in Europe. It is separated from the Mediterranean by a 22-kilometre (14 mi) long narrow sandy strip known as La Manga del Mar Menor or simply La Manga. La Manga del Mar Menor is a sandy barrier resting on a discontinuous lithological substrate shaped by the presence of tidal inlets (golas). The sandy substrate was deposited during the Quaternary, overlying Palaeozoic schists, volcanic rocks and Miocene sandstones. It is probably the most developed and overcrowded holiday area of Murcia, despite being declared one of the Specially Protected Areas of Mediterranean Importance (SPAMI) by the United Nations.

Mar Menor's muds are famous for their therapeutic properties. Apart from Mar Menor, the Murcian coast from Cartagena to the frontier with Andalusia alternates between wild and unspoilt rocky areas, large sandy beaches, and the towns of Mazarrón and Águilas.

The needs of tourism have forced the area to add all kinds of facilities and services. A construction boom resulted in a huge number of estates, including the controversial holiday resorts of Polaris World, second residences, and numerous malls. Thanks to the orography and climate of the region, these lands are suitable for golf courses, a fact that has been very controversial because of the need for water, which Murcia lacks, being a very dry region.

Other services include adventure tourism companies, tourist routes, guided visits, yacht facilities, nautical excursions, and sports federations.

Golf, and in particular golf tourism, has become important to the economy and draws visitors from around the world, particularly the United States, United Kingdom, Scandinavia, and Germany. Unlike other parts of Europe, especially northern Europe, the weather in high season can almost be guaranteed to be dry and sunny. This has led to the creation of specialist golf holidays to bring in visitors from April to June and September to November, especially. Unlike in other parts of the country, golf courses are quieter in July and August due to the extreme heat.

==== Natural resources and rural tourism ====
The Region of Murcia has 19 areas under different statutes of environmental protection, representing 6% of its territory.

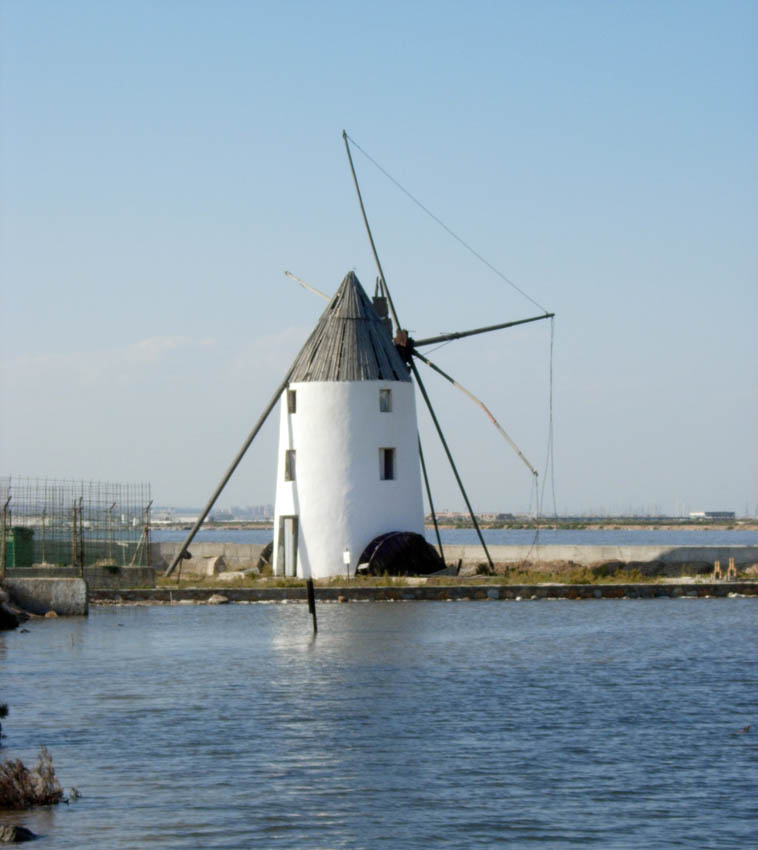
San Pedro's marsh

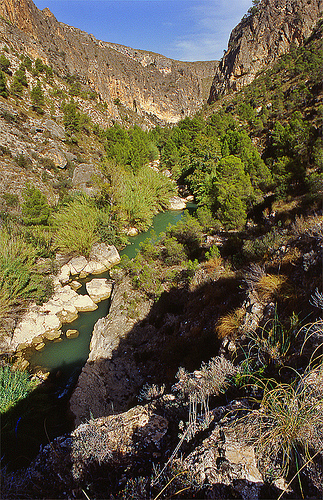
Almadenes Canyon

- The Sierra Espuña – a protected natural space of 17,804 hectares (43,990 acres) in area. It is located on the Baetic Cordillera within the basin of the Segura River. This regional park is centred around the 1,583-metre (5,194 ft) Sierra Espuña mountain. It has been declared a Special Protection Area for birds.
- Salinas y Arenales de San Pedro del Pinatar – a salt marsh by the Mar Menor.
- Parque regional de Cabo Cope y Puntas de Calnegre, between Águilas and Lorca, by the Mediterranean sea. The regional government attempted to amend Law 1/2001 of 24 April on Land in the Region of Murcia, to declassify a total of 1,600 hectares (4,000 acres) of the land protected by the regional park, but the attempt was annulled by the Constitutional Court of Spain. Rare species of animals (Bonelli's eagle, Greek tortoise, martingale) and plants are threatened.
- Calblanque Regional Park – between La Manga and Cartagena, has beaches that are favoured by Murcians, although it is an undeveloped area.
- Carrascoy y el Valle – a Special Protection Area and Site of Community Importance (SCI).
- Sierra de la Pila – is also a Special Protection Area.
- Sierra del Carche – also part of the Baetic Cordillera. It is in the north of the region, in the Yecla and Jumilla municipalities.
- Cañón de Almadenes – a Special Protection Area on the Segura River.
- Humedal del Ajuaque y Rambla Salada – another wetland and Special Protection Area.
- Cerro de Cabezo Gordo – contains the Sima de las Palomas archaeological site, a cave where the second oldest human remains in the Iberian Peninsula were found.
- Sierra de la Muela, Cabo Tiñoso y Roldán – coastal mountains in the south of the region and in Cartagena municipality.
- A group of islands and islets on the Murcian Mediterranean that are of ecological importance.
- Espacios abiertos e islas del Mar Menor – including five volcanic islands in the Mar Menor.
- Sierra de las Moreras – is a mountain range that occupies part of Mazarrón municipality in the south of the region. It is a Site of Community Importance.
- Sotos y Bosque de la ribera de Cañaverosa
- Sierra de Salinas
- Barrancos de Gebas
- Saladares del Guadalentín
- Cuatro Calas

The interior of the region, near the historical towns of Caravaca de la Cruz and Moratalla, offers a number of rural accommodations and facilities, including cottages, farmhouses, country houses, and campsites. Visitors can engage in sports, day trips, and sightseeing excursions.

== Transport ==
=== Road ===
The region's highway network provides connectivity along the coast, with three highway links with Andalusia (Autovía A-91, Autovía A-7, and the tolled Autopista AP-7) and another three with the Valencian Community (A-7 and the tolled AP-7 and Autopista AP-37), but only the Autovía A-30 connects Murcia with inland Spain. It is thus the goal of the regional government to provide alternative highway corridors that connect the interior to the coastal zones.

The autonomous government is investing heavily in its highway network, both for trips along the coast and inland–coast connectivity. Due to the expansion of the regional network that this effort is expected to produce, Murcia has recently implemented a new naming scheme for its regional highways, more in accordance with that of the national network. When the renaming is complete, all highways will be identified by white-on-blue names that start with RM (for Región de Murcia).

Signage	Type	Highway name	Route
RM-1	Interurban	Autovía RM-1	San Javier (AP-7) — Zeneta (MU-30/RM-30/†AP-37)
RM-2	Interurban	Autovía Alhama – Campo de Cartagena	Alhama (A-7) — RM-23 — Fuente Álamo (MU-602) — Cartagena (A-30)
RM-3	Interurban	Autovía RM-3	Totana (A-7) — RM-23 — Mazarrón (AP-7)
RM-11	Interurban	Autovía RM-11	Lorca (A-7) — N-332 — Águilas (AP-7)
RM-12	Access road	Autovía de La Manga	Cartagena (AP-7/CT-32) — El Algar (N-332) — La Manga del Mar Menor
RM-15	Interurban	Autovía del Noroeste	Alcantarilla (MU-30/A-7) — Mula — Caravaca de la Cruz (C-415/RM-714)
RM-19	Access road	Autovía del Mar Menor	A-30 — Polaris World — San Javier (AP-7)
RM-23	Interurban	Autovía de conexión RM-23	RM-2 — RM-3

*: in construction — †: planned

=== Rail ===
The Chinchilla–Cartagena railway provides the only rail route to Madrid from the region. The Cercanías Murcia/Alicante commuter rail network connects Murcia to Alicante, via Orihuela and Elche, along with a branch to Águilas.

The Madrid–Levante high-speed rail network is due to reach Murcia in 2021, and the Murcia–Almería high-speed rail line will connect the region to Almería by 2023.

=== Air ===
The Región de Murcia International Airport opened in 2019, replacing the Murcia San Javier Airport for passenger flights. It was used by a million passengers in its first year of operation. Alicante Airport, although outside Murcia, is also used by air travellers from the region.

=== Sea ===
The Port of Cartagena is the region's only port. 60% of the region's exports and 80% of its imports go through the port.

== Notable people ==
- Ibn Arabi (1165–1240) – thinker and poet.
- Francisco Salzillo (1707–1785) – carver of religious imagery.
- Isaac Peral
- Juan de la Cierva, 1st Count of la Cierva
- Antonio Oliver (1903–1968) – writer
- Ana Carrasco (born 1997) – motorcycle racer
- Carmen Conde (1907–1996) – writer and poet.
- Bárbara Rey – actress born in 1950.
- Arturo Pérez-Reverte – writer born in Cartagena in 1951.
- Ginés García Millán – theatre, cinema, and television actor.
- Carlos Santos – actor.
- Nicolás Almagro – former tennis player born in 1985.
- Blas Cantó – a singer born in 1991.
- Francisco Rabal (1926–2001) – an actor, director, and screenwriter.
- Dennis Waterman (1948–2022) actor and singer, lived in La Manga from 2015 to 2022.
- Juan Soto Ivars – novelist and columnist (born 1985)
- Carlos Alcaraz – tennis player (born 2003)

== See also ==
- List of municipalities in Murcia
