= Santa Teresa flood =

1879 flood in Spain

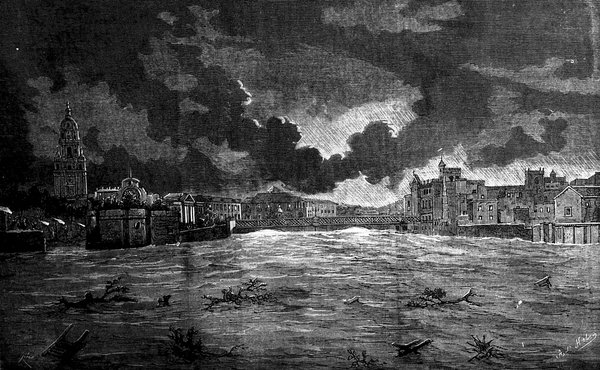
Engraving of the Santa Teresa flood passing through Murcia. By Gustave Doré.

The flood of Santa Teresa took place on 15 October 1879 due to an overflow of the Segura river and resulted in more than 1000 deaths and heavy material damage. It is the worst recorded flood in Murcia history.

== The flood ==
The rainfall that caused the flood was extremely heavy. It is estimated that at the head of the Guadalentín, 600 mm fell in just one hour. This river reached a flow in Lorca of 1450 m³/s, overflowing and causing great damage throughout its basin. The flow of Mundo, Alhárabe, Argos, Quípar and Mula rivers also increased rapidly. Thus, an enormous flood arose that reached 1,890 m³/s in the capital of Murcia and is estimated to have exceeded 2,000 m³/s in Orihuela.

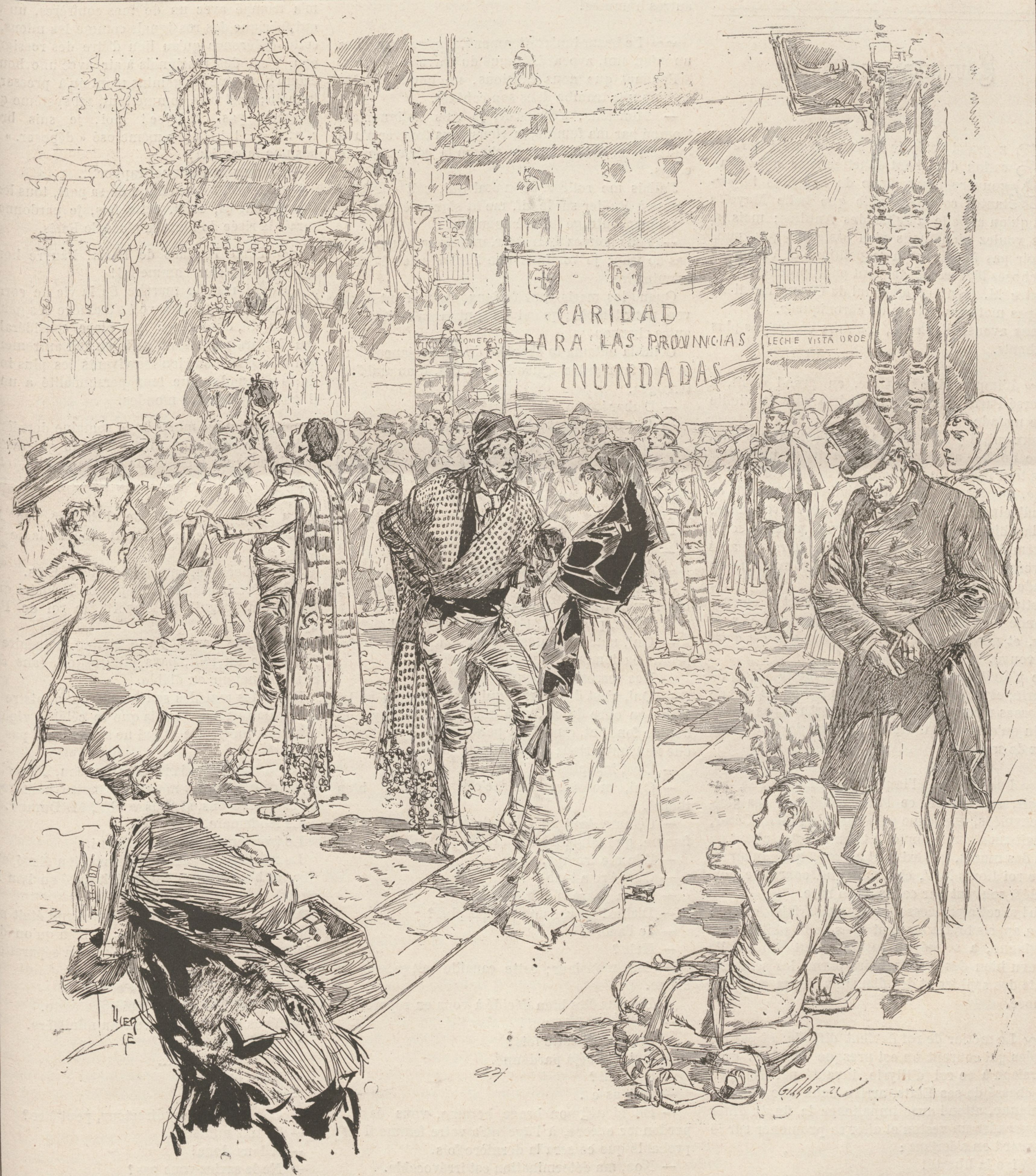
Request for help in the streets of Madrid for those affected by the floods

The city of Murcia was completely flooded by the Segura river that, after flooding numerous districts to the north and west of the urban area, surpassed the Malecón dam-like construction and burst into the center. In Orihuela, after its confluence with the Guadalentín (Reguerón) river, the Segura also reached heights of up to 3.80 meters in some streets, reaching the first floors.

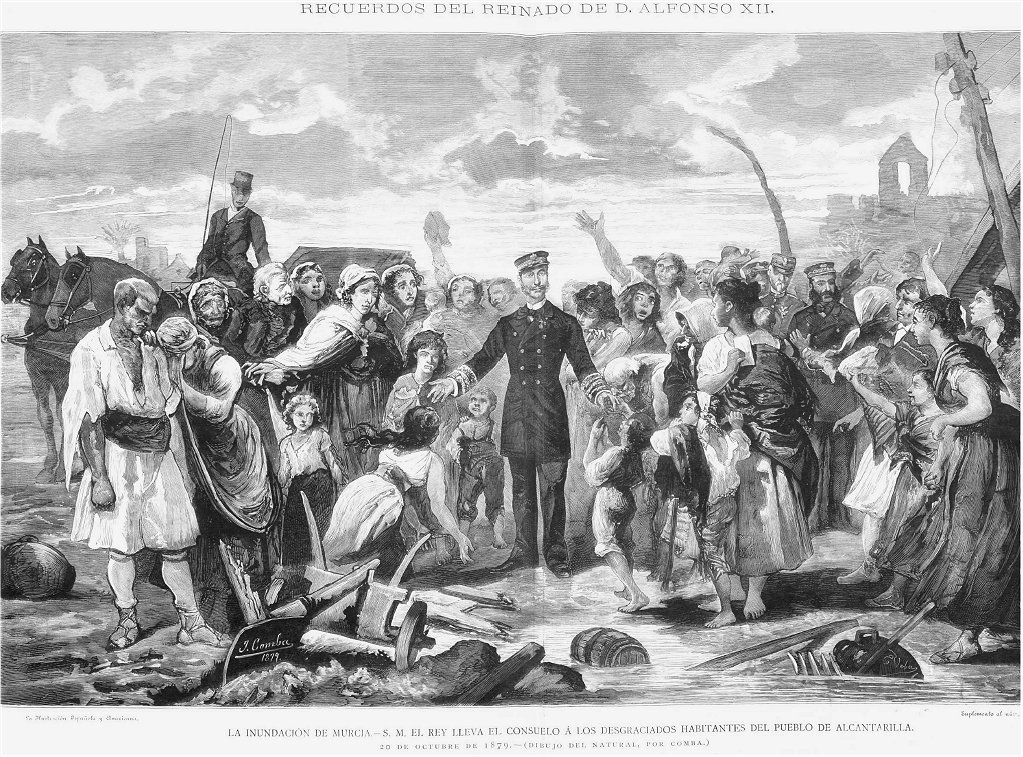
Engraving of Alfonso XII's visit in the aftermath of the flood.

The flood devastated the Guadalentín Valley, and the entire alluvial plain of Segura, with considerable human and material losses. The catastrophe left more than a thousand dead: 761 in Murcia, 300 in Orihuela, 13 in Lorca, two in Librilla and one in Cieza. 5,762 houses and a barracks in Murcia and Lorca were destroyed and 22,469 animals died in the disaster. It is widely described as the "most catastrophic flood ever recorded in Murcia".

After the disaster, several people and companies dedicated themselves to carrying out charity collections for the victims, such as the one organized by the Murcian press that collected money from all over Spain until 1884. José María Muñoz, a wealthy man from Cáceres, donated 500,000 pesetas to the Region of Murcia and 2,000,000 reales to the city of Orihuela.

In the month of March 1881, Piedad de la Cruz left Barcelona with three postulants. They arrived at the Huerta de Murcia, with the approval of the bishopric of Cartagena, with the intention of founding a religious family dedicated to caring for the poor, sick and orphans caused by the flood.
