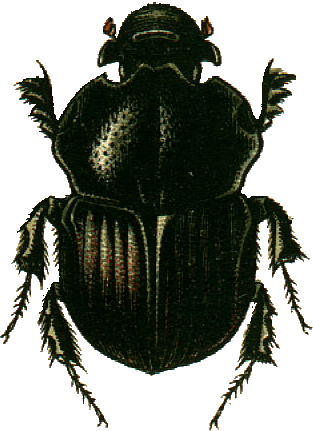

Conservation status
- Least Concern (IUCN 3.1)

Scientific classification
- Kingdom: Animalia
- Phylum: Arthropoda
- Class: Insecta
- Order: Coleoptera
- Suborder: Polyphaga
- Infraorder: Scarabaeiformia
- Family: Scarabaeidae
- Genus: Bubas
- Species: B. bubalus

Binomial name
- Bubas bubalus (Olivier, 1811)

Synonyms
- Bubas brunnipterus Mulsant, 1842; Bubas bubalus brunnipterus Mulsant, 1842; Bubas bubalus inermifrons Mulsant, 1842; Bubas bubalus integricornis Mulsant, 1842; Bubas bubalus simplicifrons Mulsant, 1842; Bubas inermifrons Mulsant, 1842; Bubas integricornis Mulsant, 1842; Bubas simplicifrons Mulsant, 1842; Onitis bubalus Olivier, 1811

= Bubas bubalus =

Species of beetle

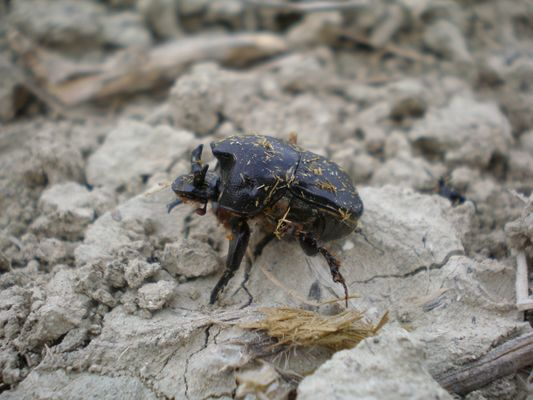
Bubas bubalus, Bubas bubale, Spain

Bubas bubalus is a species of beetle of the subfamily Scarabaeinae within the family Scarabaeidae. It is widespread in central and northern Spain, southern France, Portugal, Gibraltar, Monaco and Italy. The species could also be found on the Balearic Islands. They like a temperate climate. Adults are found in manure from October to July.
