= Melanella parviapertura =

Scientific classification
- Kingdom: Animalia
- Phylum: Mollusca
- Class: Gastropoda
- Subclass: Caenogastropoda
- Order: Littorinimorpha
- Family: Eulimidae
- Genus: Melanella
- Species: †M. parviapertura

Binomial name
- †Melanella parviapertura Landau, La Perna & Marquet, 2006

Species of gastropod

Melanella parviapertura is an extinct species of sea snail, a marine gastropod mollusk in the family Eulimidae. The species is one of a number within the genus Melanella.

== Distribution ==
Fossils from this species were found in Early Pliocene strata in Southern Spain.
