= Espíritu Santo, Riópar =

Church of Espíritu Santo
- Iglesia Parroquial del Espíritu Santo (Spanish)
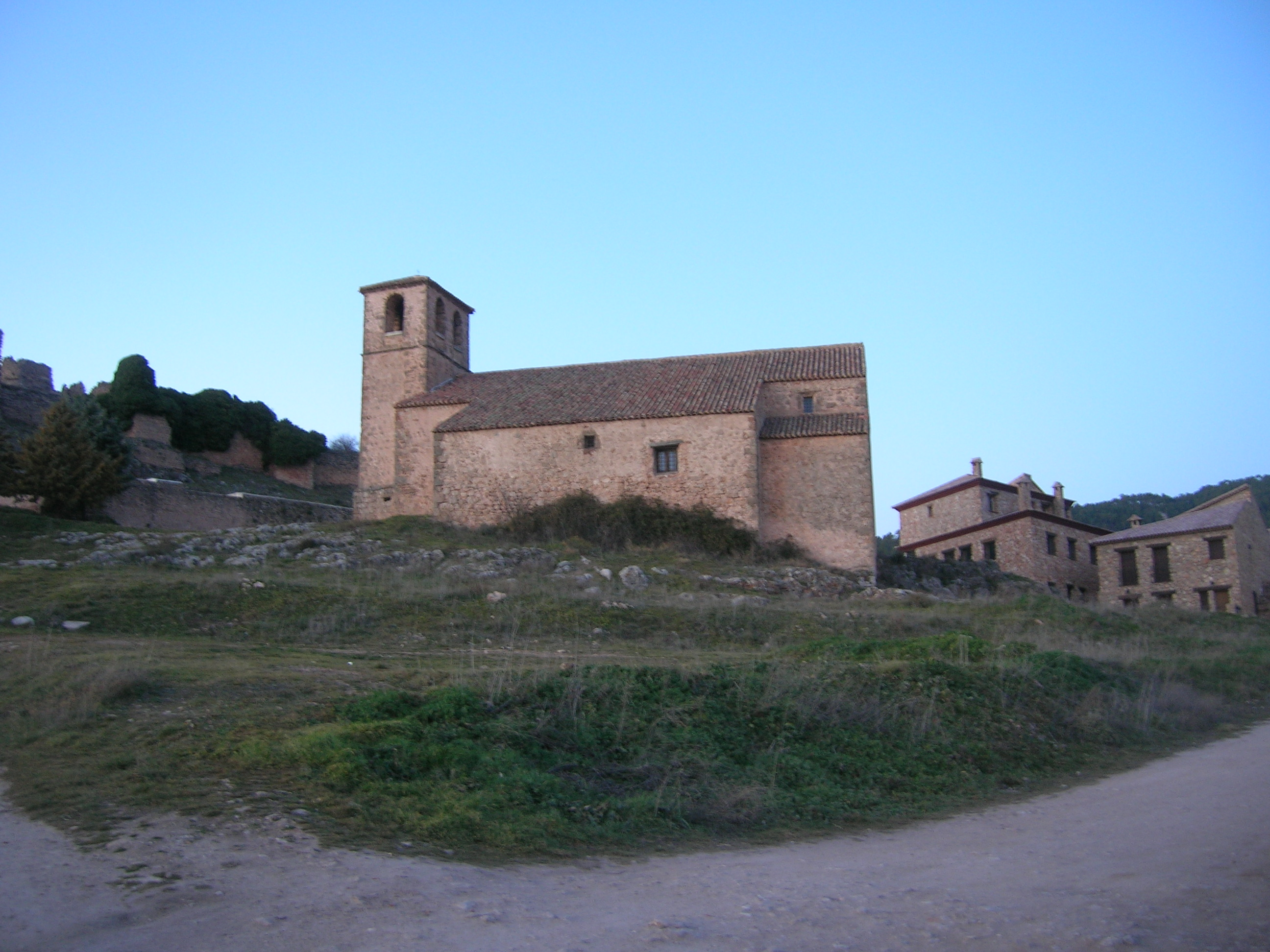

- Location within Spain
- 38.503957°N 2.447518°W
- Location: Riópar, Spain

Spanish Cultural Heritage
- Official name: Iglesia Parroquial del Espíritu Santo
- Type: Non-movable
- Criteria: Monument
- Designated: 1981
- Reference no.: RI-51-0004544

Espíritu Santo (Spanish: Iglesia Parroquial del Espíritu Santo) is a Roman Catholic parish church located in Riópar, province of Albacete, Castilla-La Mancha, Spain.

A church at the site was likely erected after the conquest of the region by the Christians in the 14th century; however, this church is not documented until 1475. The style mingles Gothic and mudejar elements.

It was declared Bien de Interés Cultural in 1981.
