= Zumeta =

River in Spain

Zumeta Rio Zumeta
- Location of mouth

Location
- Country: Spain
- Province: Albacete

Physical characteristics
- Mouth
  - coordinates: 38.17673547336863°N 2.45795972649657°W
- Length: 20 km (12 mi)
- Basin size: 355 km^{2} (137 sq mi)

The Zumeta River, or Río Zumeta in Spanish, is a river in southeastern Spain in the Province of Albacete, Spain. The Zumeta is a formed from a confluence of various streams near Santiago de la Espada in the Province of Jaén. It is a tributary of the Segura River.

== Course ==
The Zumeta flows by the Sierras de Cazorla, Segura y Las Villas Natural Park, serving first as a park border then as a border of the Province of Albacete before it flows into the Segura River.

== Flora and Fauna ==
The Zumeta, together with the Aguacebas River, the Madera River, and the Anchuricas Reservoir (el Embalse de Anchuricas), is one of the areas of the Sierras de Cazorla, Segura y Las Villas Natural Park designated as a high-mountain trout fishing area with rules for catch-and-release fishing of the brown trout.

The Zumeta is protected as a natural river reserve from its point of origin to the Novia Reservoir.

== See also ==
- List of rivers of Spain

== Bibliography ==
- Carreño Cuevas, A. y Mateo Saura, M.A.: Investigaciones de arte rupestre en la cuenca del río Zumeta (Albacete y Jaén), II Congreso de Historia de Albacete: del 22 al 25 de noviembre de 2000, Vol. 1, 2002 (Arqueología y prehistoria / coord. por Rubí Sanz Gamo), ISBN 84-95394-40-5, págs. 103-109.
