= Mundo (river) =

River in Spain

Río Mundo
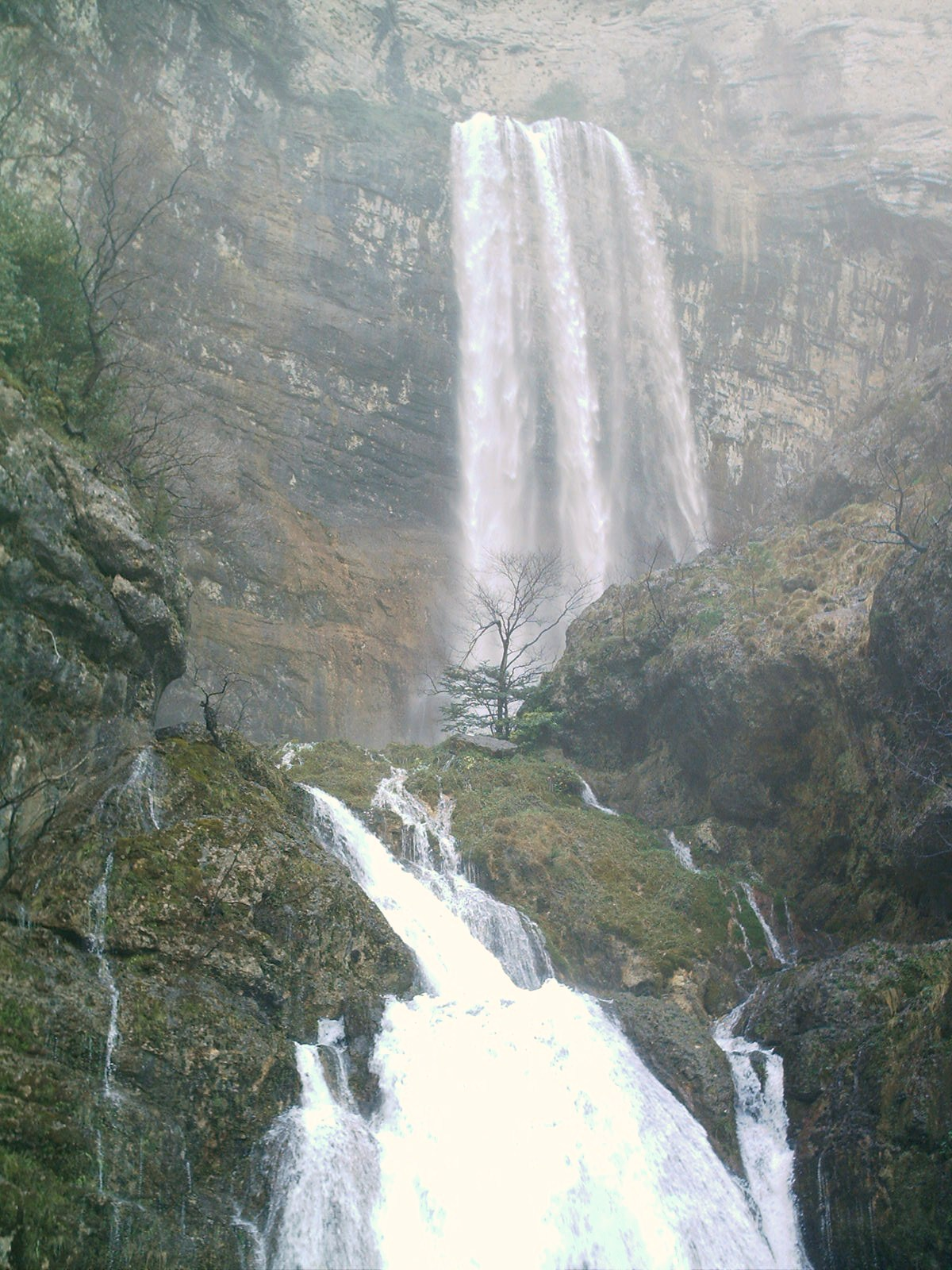
- Source of the Mundo River

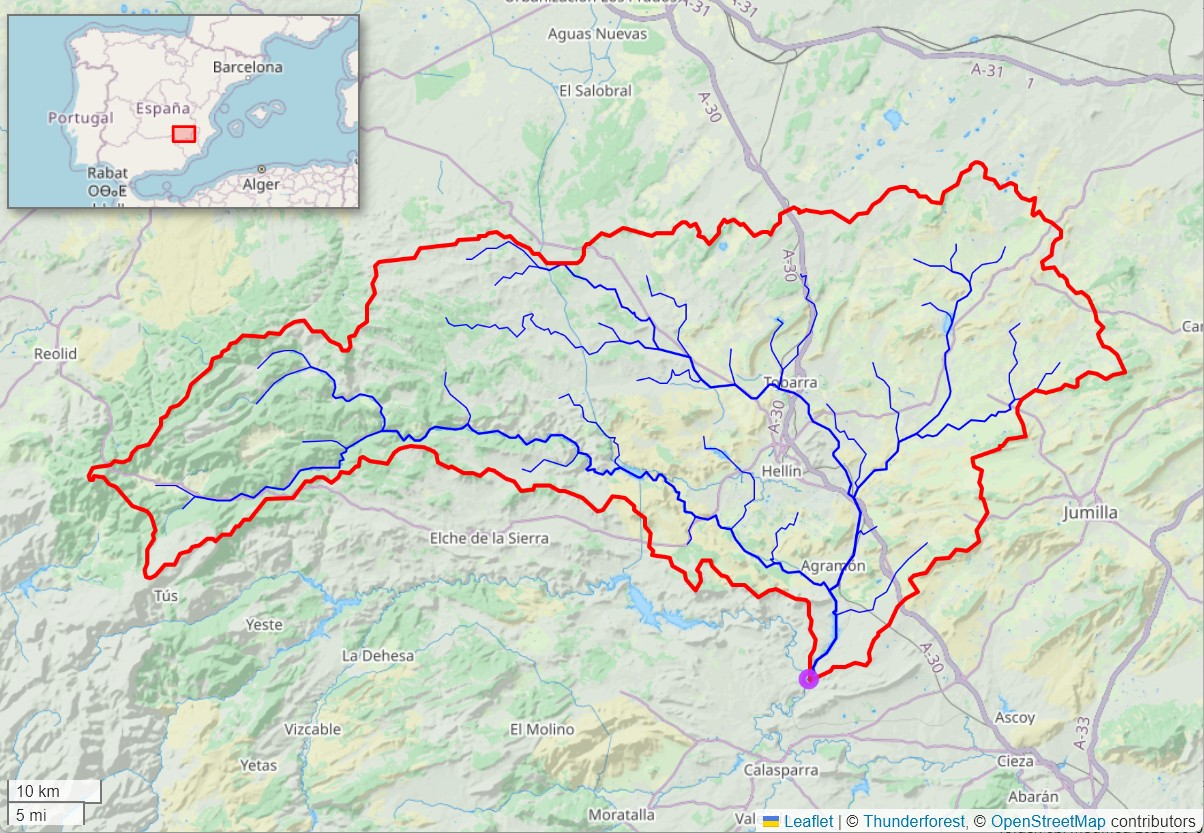
- Mundo River watershed (Interactive map)

Location
- Country: Spain

Physical characteristics
- Source: Reventón del Rio Mundo
  - location: South of Riópar, Province of Albacete
  - coordinates: 38.451°N 2.436°W
  - elevation: 1,300 m (4,300 ft)
- Mouth
  - location: Confluence with Segura River
  - coordinates: 38.315°N 1.669°W
  - elevation: 300 m (980 ft)
- Length: 150 km (93 mi)
- Basin size: 766 km^{2} (296 sq mi)
- Discharge
  - average: 20 m^{3}/s (710 cu ft/s)

The Mundo is a river in southeastern Spain that originates slightly south of Riópar in the mountain plateau Calar del Mundo and flows toward the town, then westward until joining the Segura south of Hellín.

The Mundo has a length of 150 km and a drainage area of 766 km^{2}. It receives most of its tributaries in its upper course. They include the Rio de la Vega, the Rio de los Vadillos and the Rio de Bogarra. The Arroyo de Tobarra is the only significant tributary in its lower course. There are two reservoirs along the course of the Mundo: the Talave reservoir with a volume of 34 cubic hectometres (1,200 million cubic feet) and the Camarillas reservoir with a volume of 36.5 cubic hectometres (1,290 million cubic feet). At the Talave reservoir the Mundo receives additional water via a 250 km long aqueduct coming from reservoirs of the Tagus river. The Camarillas reservoir triggered a series of small quakes when it was first filled in spring 1961, but the seismic activity finally ceased in spring 1962.

The Mundo river is known for its picturesque source (Reventón del Rio Mundo), which is considered one of the world's most beautiful river sources. It originates from a cave in the middle of a tall cliff and forms a waterfall with a height of almost 100 meters. Subsequently, it forms a series of smaller cascades and pools. The cave itself is about 15 meters wide and 25 meters high and constitutes the end of a large cave system under the Calar del Mundo.

== See also ==
- List of rivers of Spain
