= Alhárabe =

River in Valencia, Spain

Coordinates: 38.1940572°N 2.1224268°W

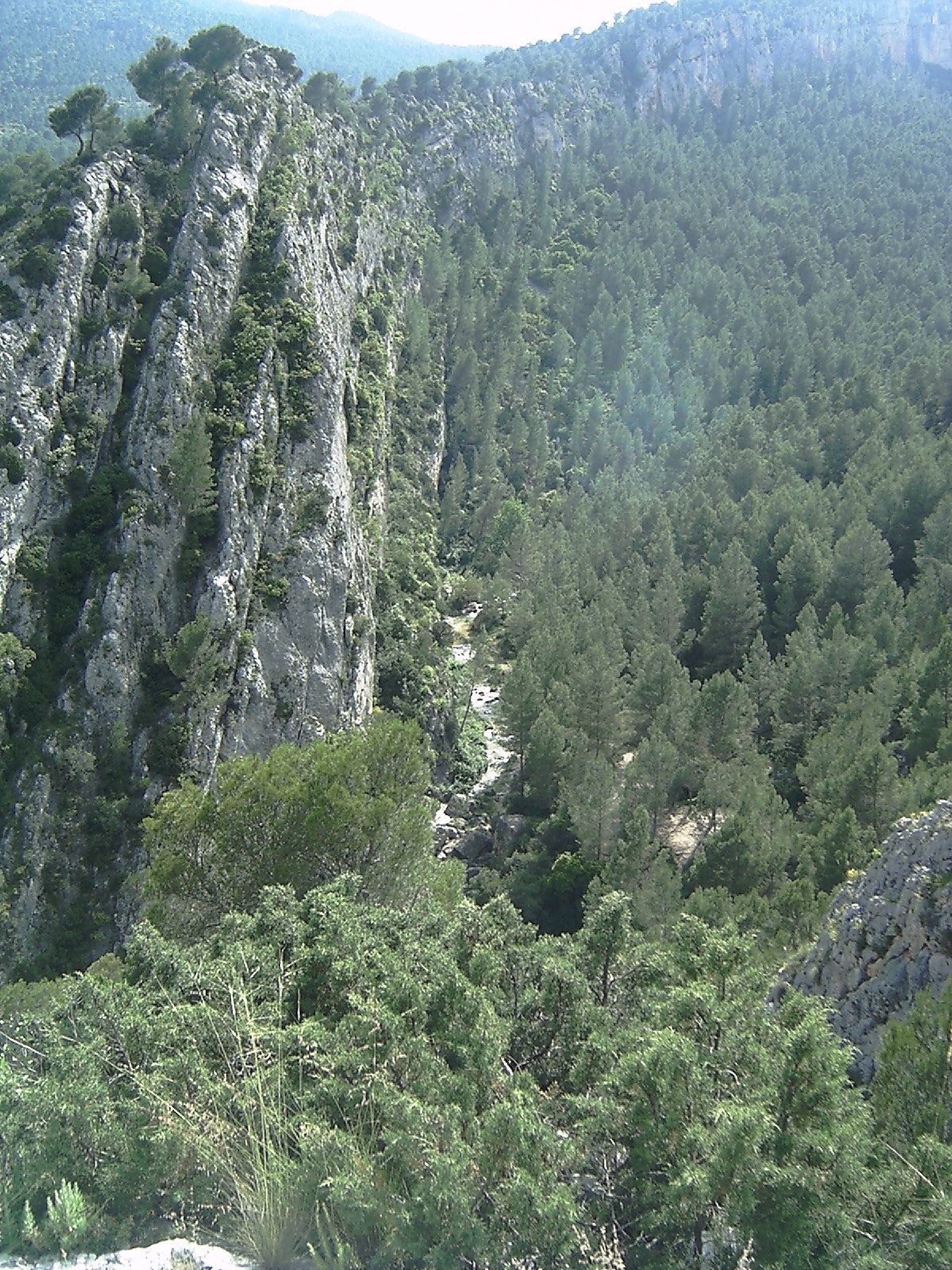
Alhárabe River as it passes through the Puerta area

Alhárabe is a river in Spain. It is a tributary of Segura.

== See also ==
- List of rivers of Spain
