= River Mula (Spain) =

Coordinates: 38°02′12″N 1°13′26″W

Mula
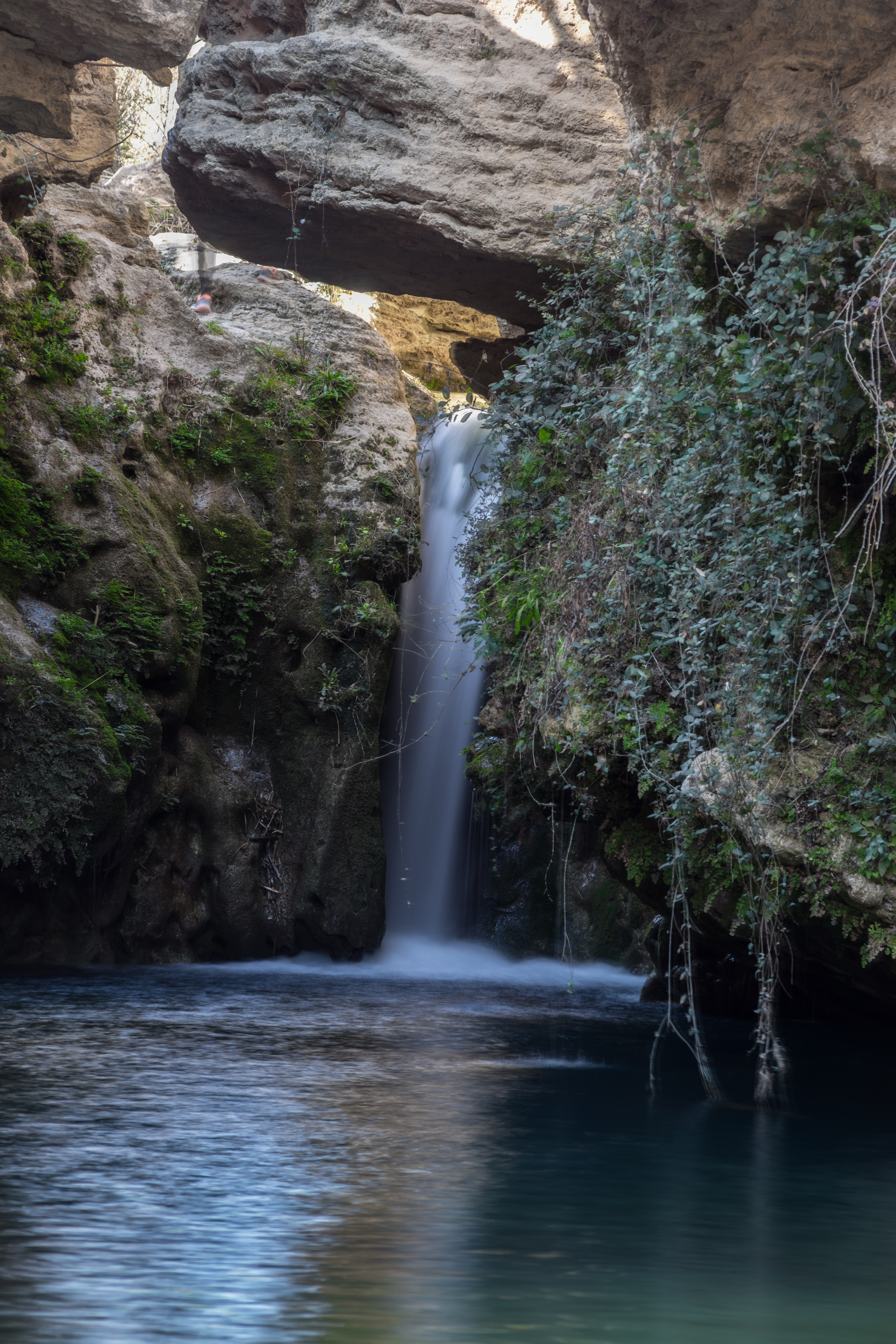

Location
- Country: Spain

Physical characteristics
- Length: 64 km (40 mi)

The Mula is a river in Murcia, Spain. The river's source is located in Bullas, tributary of the River Segura on its right bank.

== See also ==
- List of rivers of Spain
- Mula River (India), a river in India
- Mula River (Pakistan), a river in Pakistan
