= Segura (river) =

River in Spain

Coordinates: 38°5′47.17″N 0°40′32.37″W

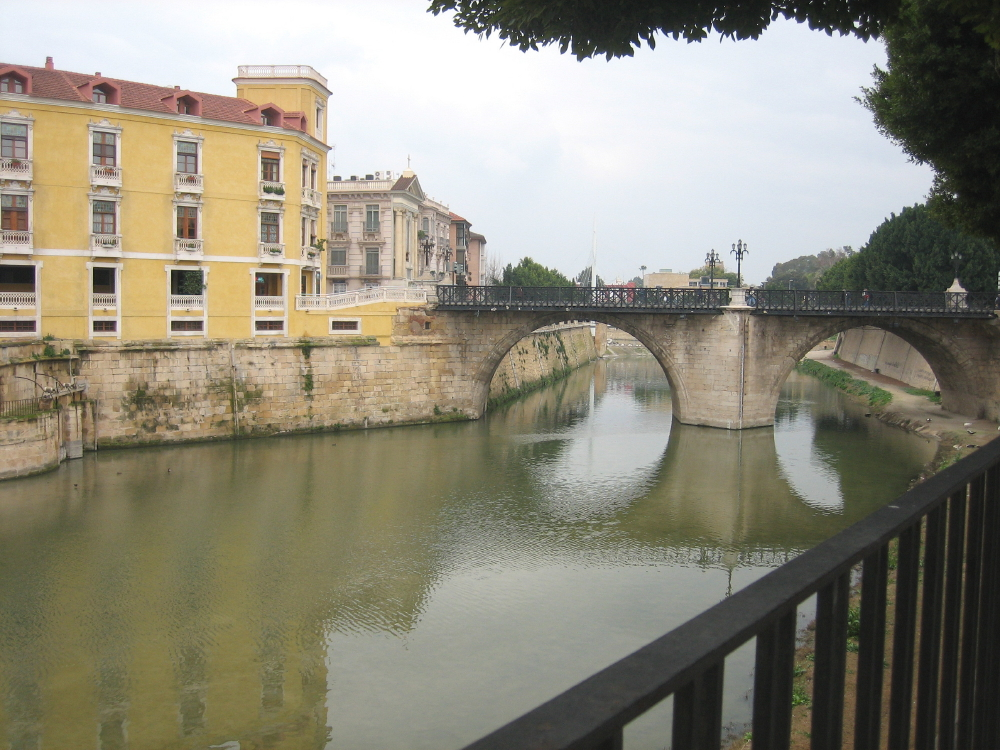
- The Segura River, at its passage by Murcia city. In the background Murcia's oldest bridge (Puente de los Peligros)

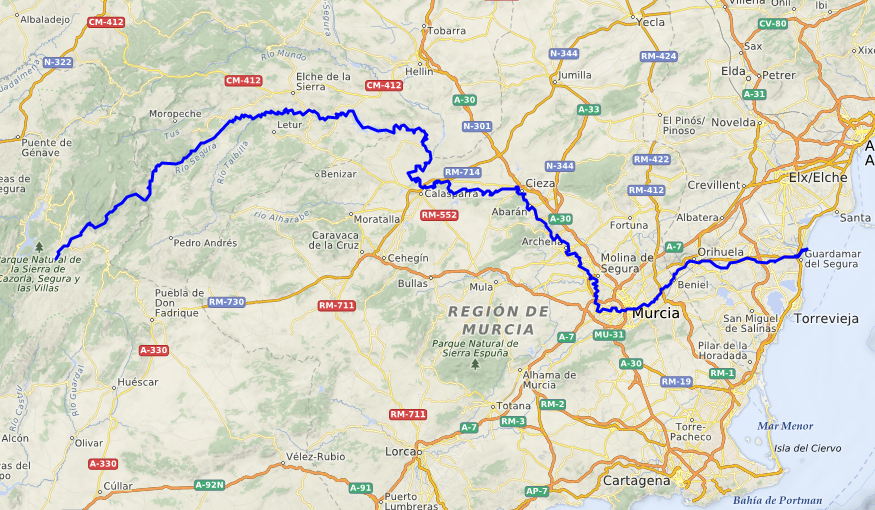
- Course of the Segura

Location
- Country: Spain

Physical characteristics
- Source: Fuente Segura, Sierra de Segura
  - location: Jaén
  - elevation: 1,413 m (4,636 ft)
- Mouth: Mediterranean Sea
  - location: Guardamar del Segura, Alicante
  - elevation: 0 m (0 ft)
- Length: 325 km (202 mi)
- Basin size: 19,525 km^{2} (7,539 sq mi)
- Discharge
  - average: Cieza: 26.3 m^{3}/s (930 cu ft/s)

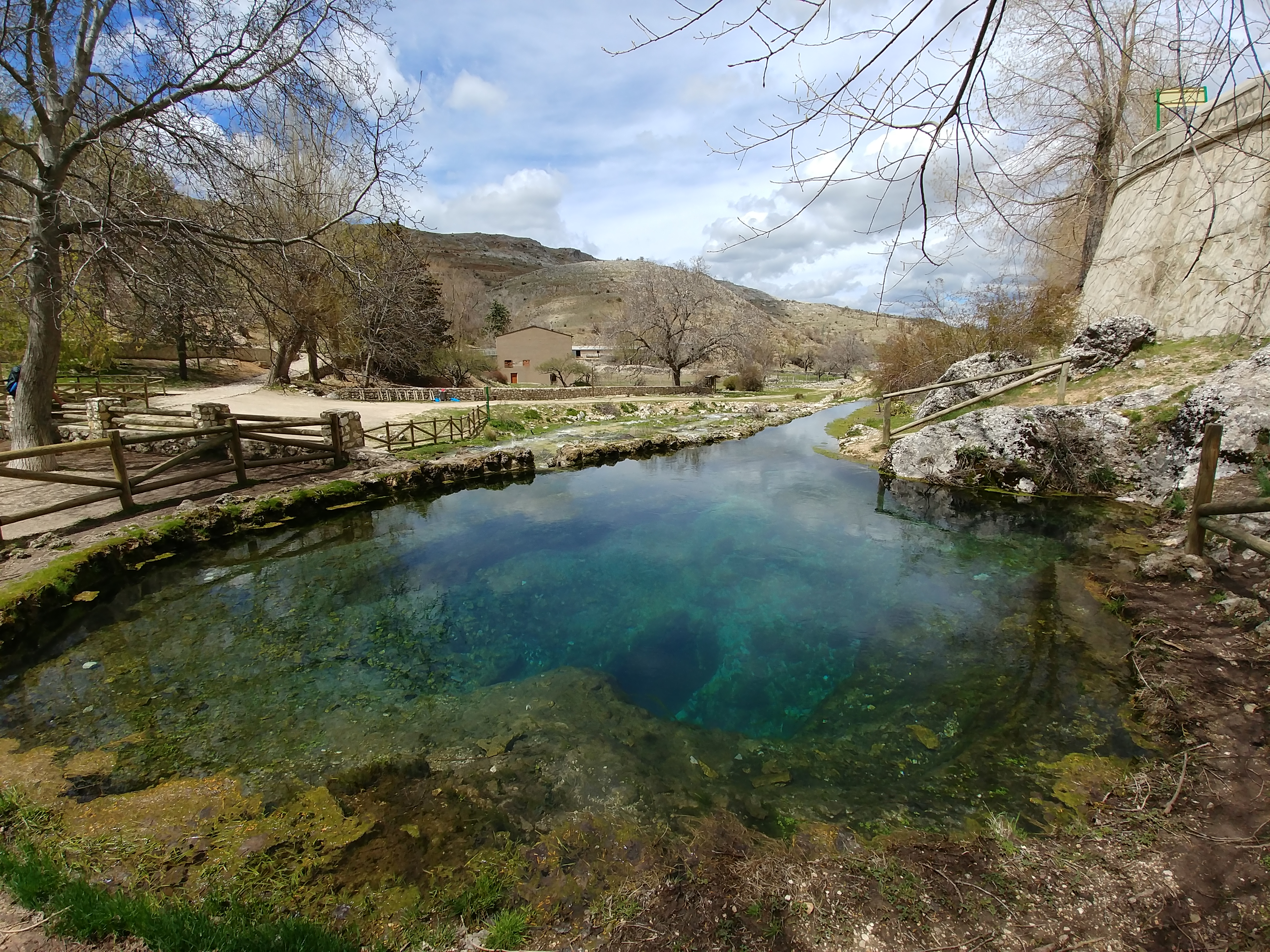
Source of the Segura River.

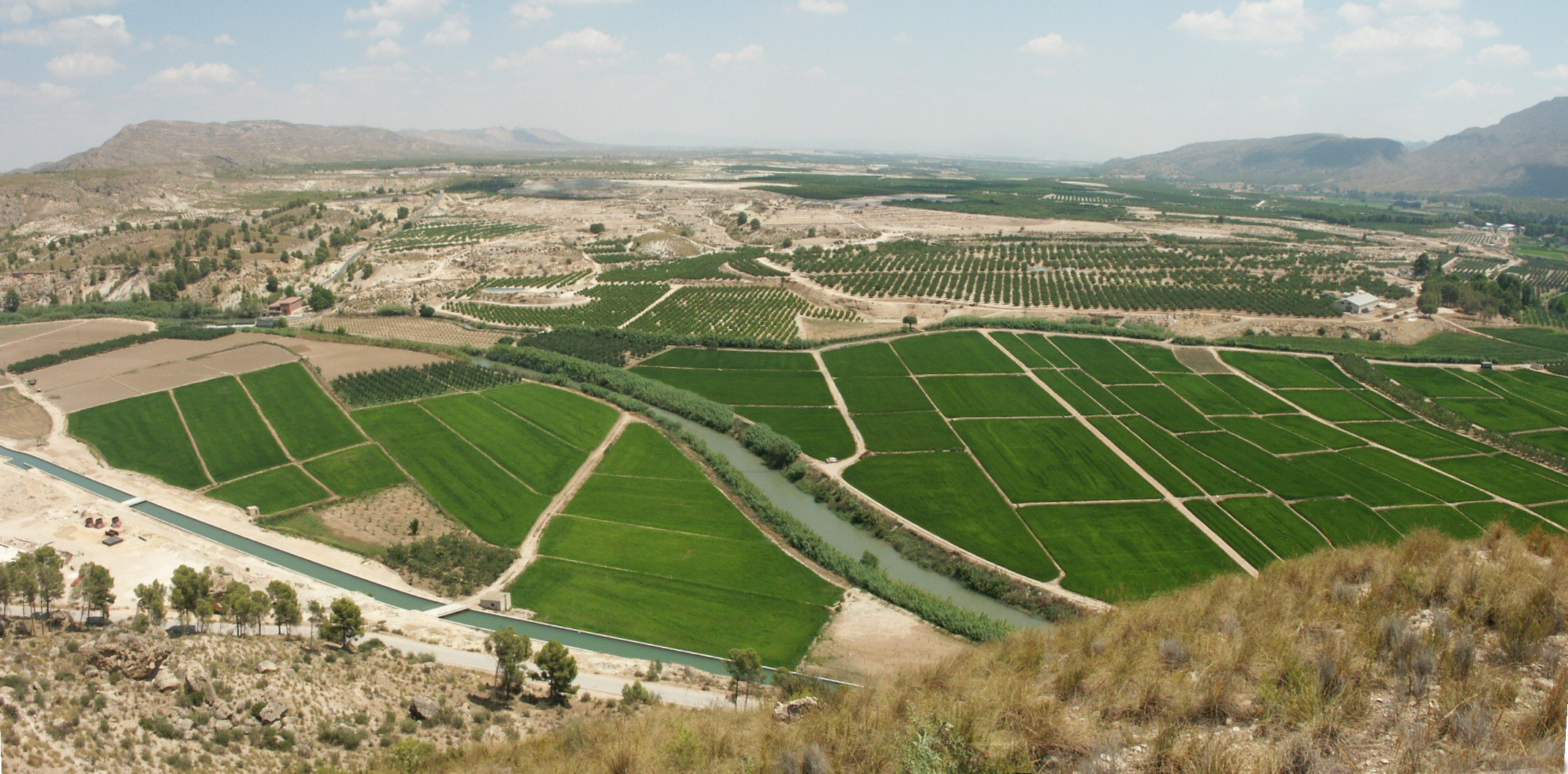
The Vega Alta del Segura near Calasparra, Murcia, famous for its rice.

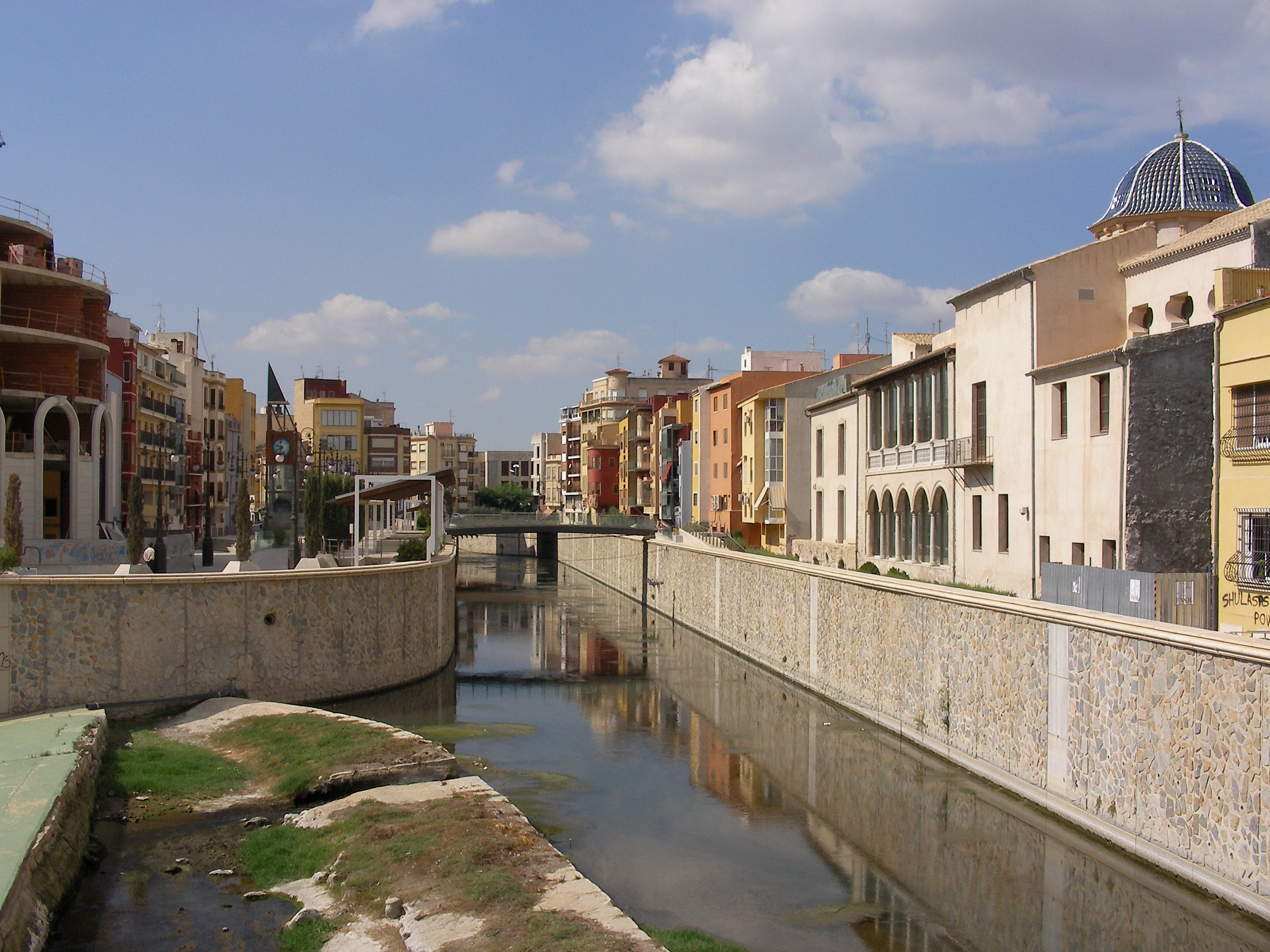
The Vega Baja del Segura in Orihuela, Alicante.

Segura (Spanish and Valencian: [seˈɣuɾa]; Latin: Thader; Arabic: شقورة, romanized: Shaqūrah, or وادي الأبيض Wādī l-Abyaḍ) is a medium-sized river in southeastern Spain. It has its source in the Sierra de Segura.

== Course ==
The 325-km (202 mi) long river begins at Santiago Pontones (province of Jaén), passes Calasparra, Cieza, Blanca, Murcia, Beniaján (Region of Murcia), Orihuela, Rojales, and flows into the Mediterranean Sea near Guardamar del Segura in the province of Alicante. Some of its tributaries are the Mundo (which starts near Riópar), the Alhárabe (which starts in Moratalla), the Mula, and the Guadalentín.

The alluvial plain is called the Vega del Segura and is a very productive agricultural region growing a wide variety of fruit, vegetables, and flowers. The Vegas are divided into three areas: Alta, Media, and Baja (upper, medium, and lower).

=== Tributaries ===
The Segura's main tributaries are:

Right bank:

- Zumeta
- River Taibilla, 2,95 m³/s
- River Alhárabe, 0,20 m³/s
  - Río Benamor
- Río Argos, 0,50 m³/s
- Río Quípar, 0,79 m³/s
- River Mula, 5,10 m³/s
  - River Pliego
- Rambla Salada
- River Guadalentín, also called Sangonera or Regueron, 1,35 m³/s
  - Rambla Bosch
  - Rambla Nogalte
  - River Luchena
  - River Turrilla
  - Rambla Torrealvilla

Left bank:

- River Madera
- River Tus, 0,15 m³/s
- River Mundo, 20,42 m³/s
  - River Bogarra
- Rambla Judío
- Rambla Moro
- Rambla Tinajón
- Rambla Abanilla

=== Recovery ===
By the 1990s, the Segura had become one of the most polluted rivers in Europe, due to the canning industry and urban and agricultural residues originating in the densely populated area in the medium and lower areas of the basin. This fact combined with low or extreme low flows in the same areas –the agricultural use of water and summer drought could reduce the mean discharge to just around 2 to 3 m^{3}/s in Murcia city– made it more difficult to dilute pollutants.

Public outcry peaked in 2001, with a demonstration gathering 40,000 people. A comprehensive action plan followed, the Segura River Project, developed by the Murcia Government's Regional Water Department, in partnership with the Segura River Authority (CHS) and town councils in the region, to restore the health of the Segura River and to supply reclaimed water to the booming agriculture industry. Between 2001 and 2010, 100 water treatment plants and 350 kilometres of wastewater collection systems were built. In addition, a wastewater reclamation levy was established to finance the operation, maintenance and monitoring of these systems, applying the principle "the polluter pays".

By 2003, the quality of the Segura's water started improving. Since 2010, pollution has been unnoticeable, leading to the recovery of fauna and flora including increased otter population in parts of the river they had once abandoned. Birds now rest at two recovered wetland areas recognised by the Ramsar Convention, during their migration between Europe and Africa. In addition, around 110 million m^{3} of reclaimed water is reused annually for agriculture in the region.

With the river coming back to life, by 2013, otters and eels –both species particularly sensitive to water pollutants– had repopulated large tracts of the river where they had been absent for decades.

As of 2015, the Segura River Project is a finalist for the 2016 European Riverprize award, organized by the International River Foundation. This recognizes the fact that the Segura went from being one of the most polluted major rivers in Europe to being the Spanish river with the lowest average pollution (considering the average of all tracts of the river) in the span of just one decade.

=== Average discharge ===
Place	Discharge
Cenajo	17.1 m^{3}/s
Cieza	26.3 m^{3}/s
Orihuela	5 m^{3}/s
Guardamar del Segura	1 m^{3}/s

== Floods ==
The Segura is usually in a state of semi-permanent drought, however, now and then, it does occasionally flood as the consequence of the torrential rains (cold drop), which typically take place once every 6–9 years approximately, always in Autumn and Spring.

The Guadalentín river, a tributary of the Segura, is the wildest European river.

In the twentieth century significant flooding occurred in 1946, 1948, 1973, 1982, 1987 and 1989. Since 1990 the lower reaches of the river have been canalized, removing meanders and hence improving the evacuation of flood waters. The new canal was put to the test in September 1997, in October 2000, in December 2016 and September 2019, when heavy rainfall resulted in significant runoff.

=== Segura floods in Murcia and Orihuela ===
Date	Murcia	Orihuela
October, 1651	1.700 m^{3}/s	
October, 1834	1.000 m^{3}/s	
15 October 1879 (Santa Teresa flood)	1.890 m^{3}/s	2.000 m^{3}/s
April, 1946	1.187 m^{3}/s	1.138 m^{3}/s
October, 1948	934 m^{3}/s	1.172 m^{3}/s
November, 1987		1.000 m^{3}/s

== See also ==
- List of rivers of Spain
- Sierras de Cazorla, Segura y Las Villas Natural Park
- La Vicaria Arch Bridge
