= Argos (river) =

River in Spain

Coordinates: 38°15′N 1°41′W

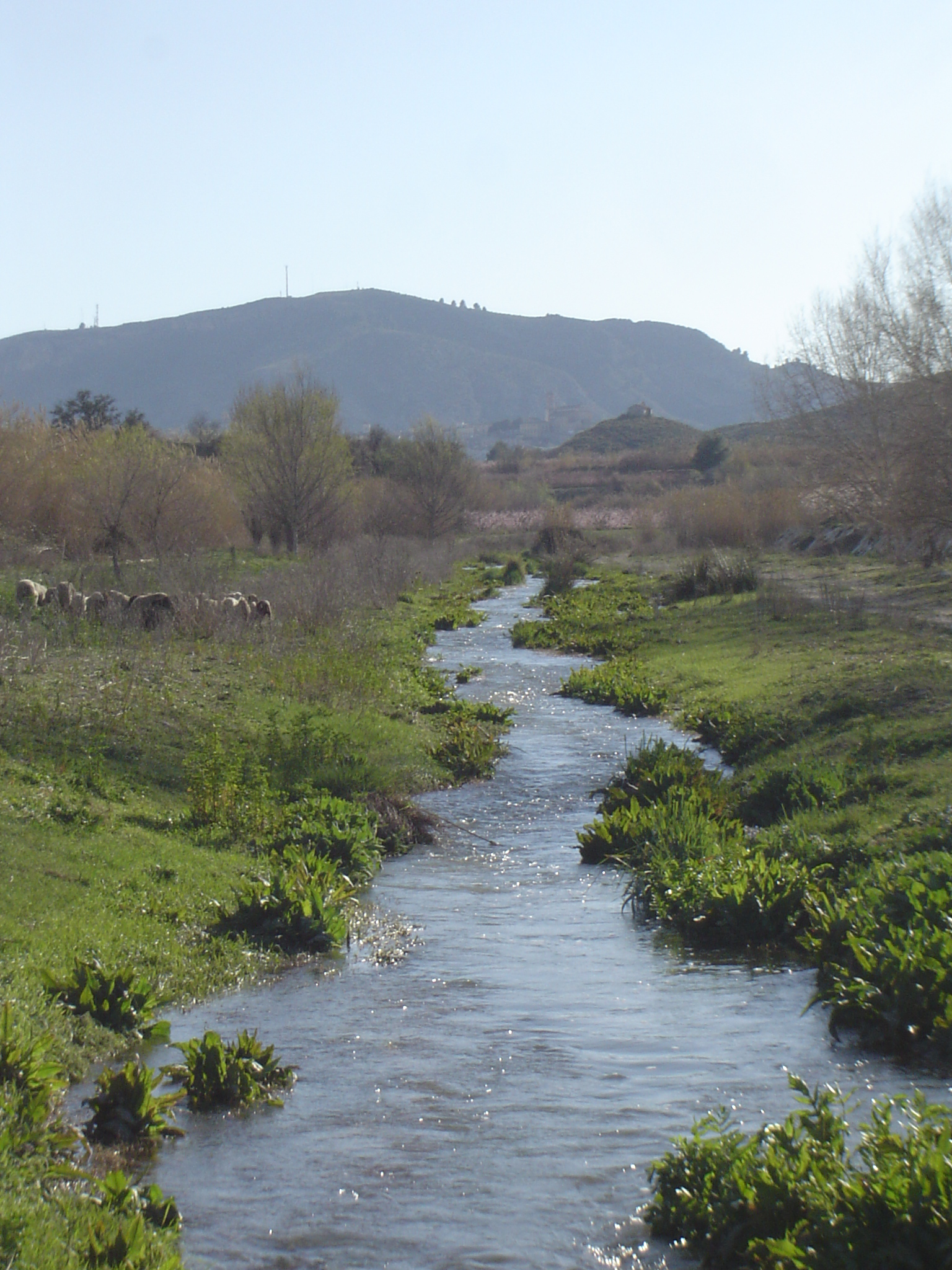
River Argos as it passes through the municipality of Cehegín

The Argos is a river in the region of Murcia, Spain. It is a tributary of the river Segura. It starts in Caravaca de la Cruz, runs through Cehegín, Valentin, and joins the Segura in Calasparra.
