= Riópar =

Municipality of Spain

Coordinates: 38°30′N 2°27′W

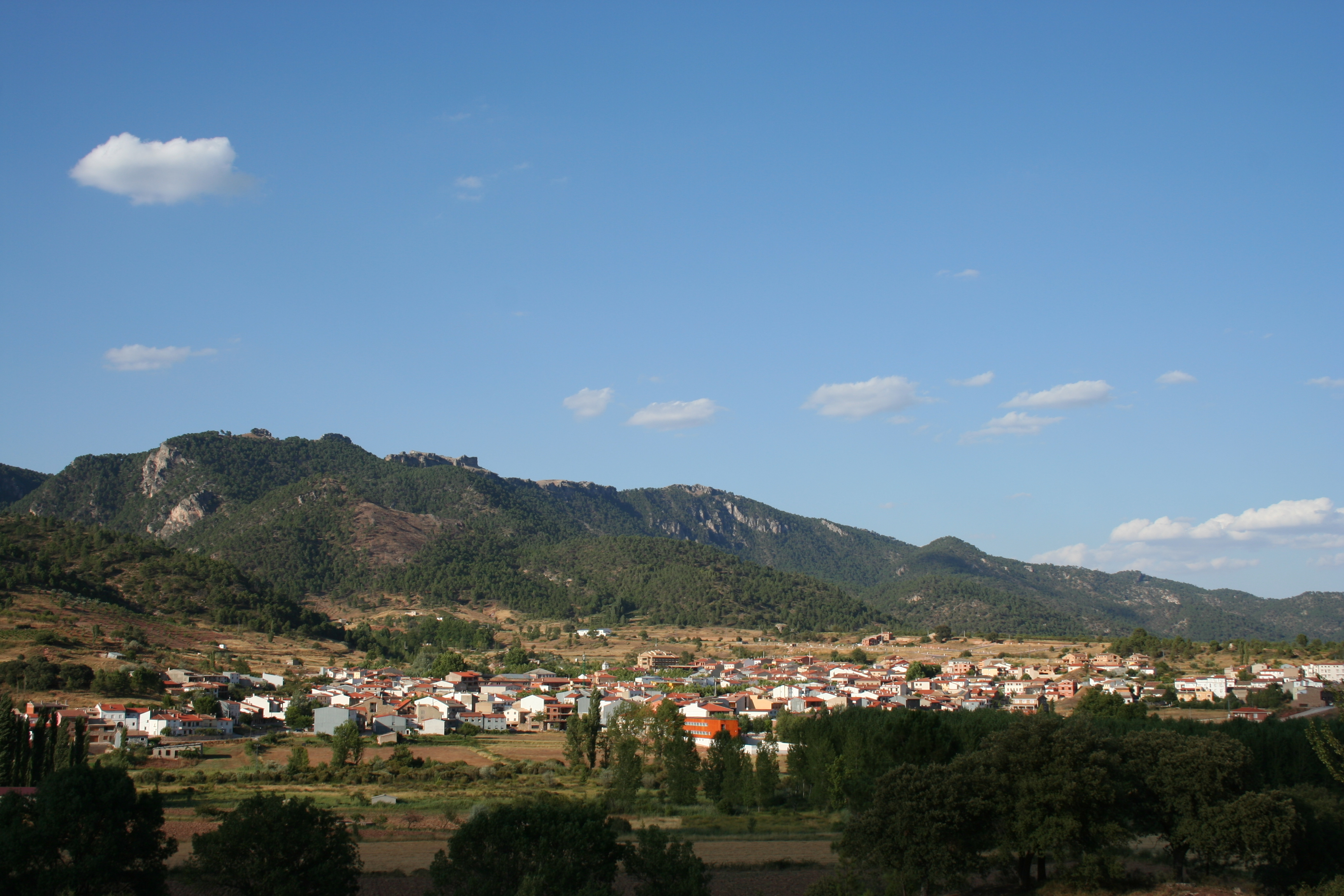
View of Riópar

Flag of Riópar

Coat of arms of Riópar

Riópar is a municipality in Albacete, Castile-La Mancha, Spain. It has a population of 1,498.

== See also ==
- Church of Espíritu Santo
