= Geography of Spain =

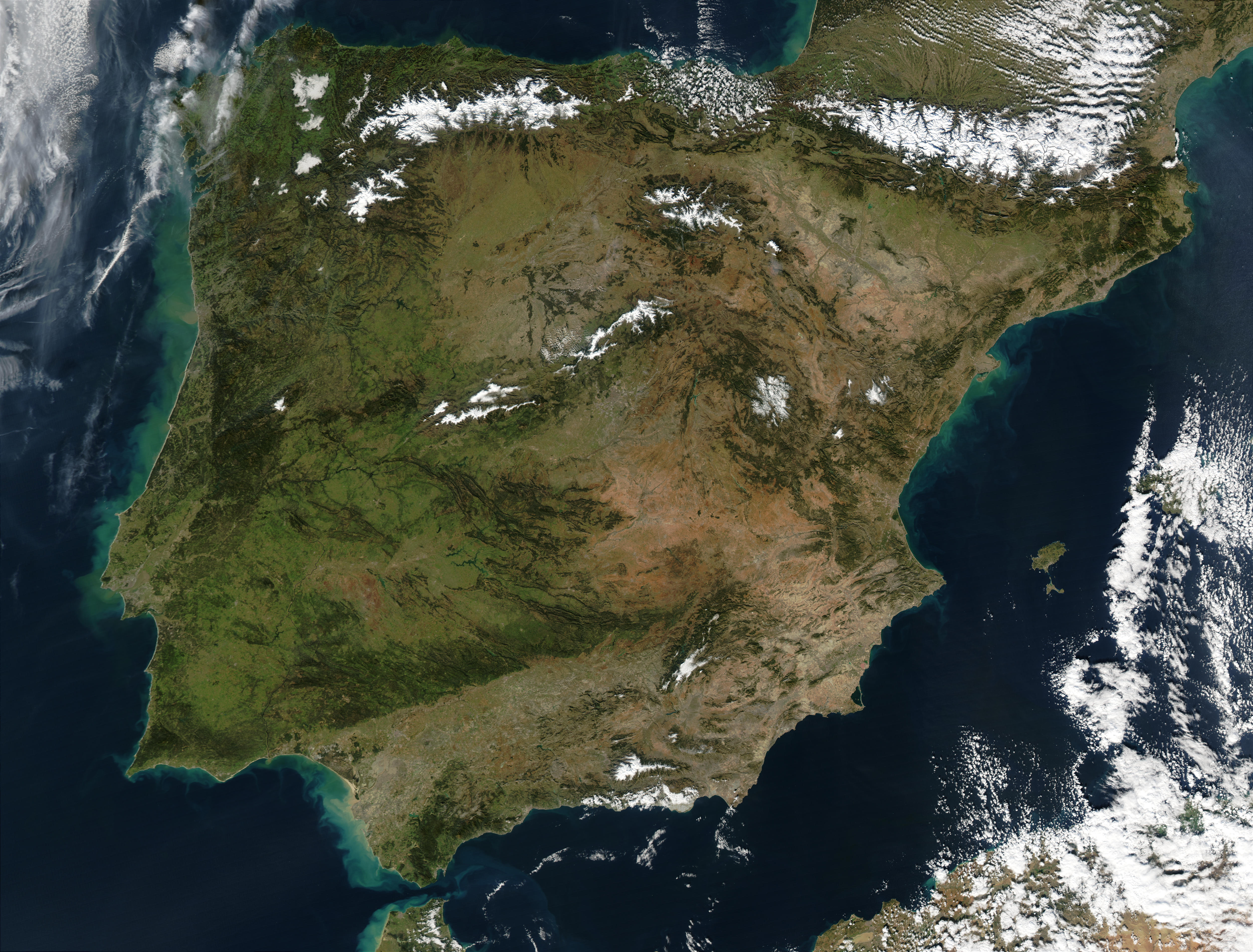
- Satellite image of the Iberian Peninsula in January 2003 taken by the MODIS instrument on board NASA's Aqua satellite
- Continent: Europe
- Region: Southern Europe; Western Europe; North Africa; Iberian Peninsula; Macaronesia
- Area: Ranked 50th
  - Total: 506,030 km^{2} (195,380 sq mi)
  - Land: 98.96%
  - Water: 1.04%
- Coastline: 5,755 km (3,576 mi)
- Borders: 1,917.8 km (1,191.7 mi); Portugal: 1,214 km (754 mi); France: 623 km (387 mi); Andorra: 63.7 km (39.6 mi); Morocco (Melilla): 9.6 km (5.97 mi); Morocco (Ceuta): 6.3 km (3.91 mi); Gibraltar (United Kingdom): 1.2 km (0.75 mi)
- Highest point: Teide (Canary Islands); 3,715 m (12,188 ft); Mulhacén (Iberian Peninsula); 3,477 m (11,407 ft)
- Lowest point: Atlantic Ocean, Mediterranean Sea; 0 m (0 ft) (Sea level)
- Longest river: Tagus 1,007 km (626 mi)
- Largest lake: Lago de Sanabria
- Climate: Temperate; clear, hot summers in interior, more moderate and cloudy along coast; cloudy, cold winters in interior, partly cloudy and cool along coast.
- Terrain: Large, flat to dissected plateau surrounded by rugged hills; Pyrenees Mountains in north.
- Natural resources: Coal, lignite, iron ore, copper, lead, zinc, uranium, tungsten, mercury, pyrites, magnesite, fluorspar, gypsum, sepiolite, kaolin, potash, hydropower, arable land.
- Natural hazards: Periodic droughts, occasional flooding and volcanic activity in the Canary Islands.
- Exclusive economic zone: 1,039,233 km^{2} (401,250 mi^{2})

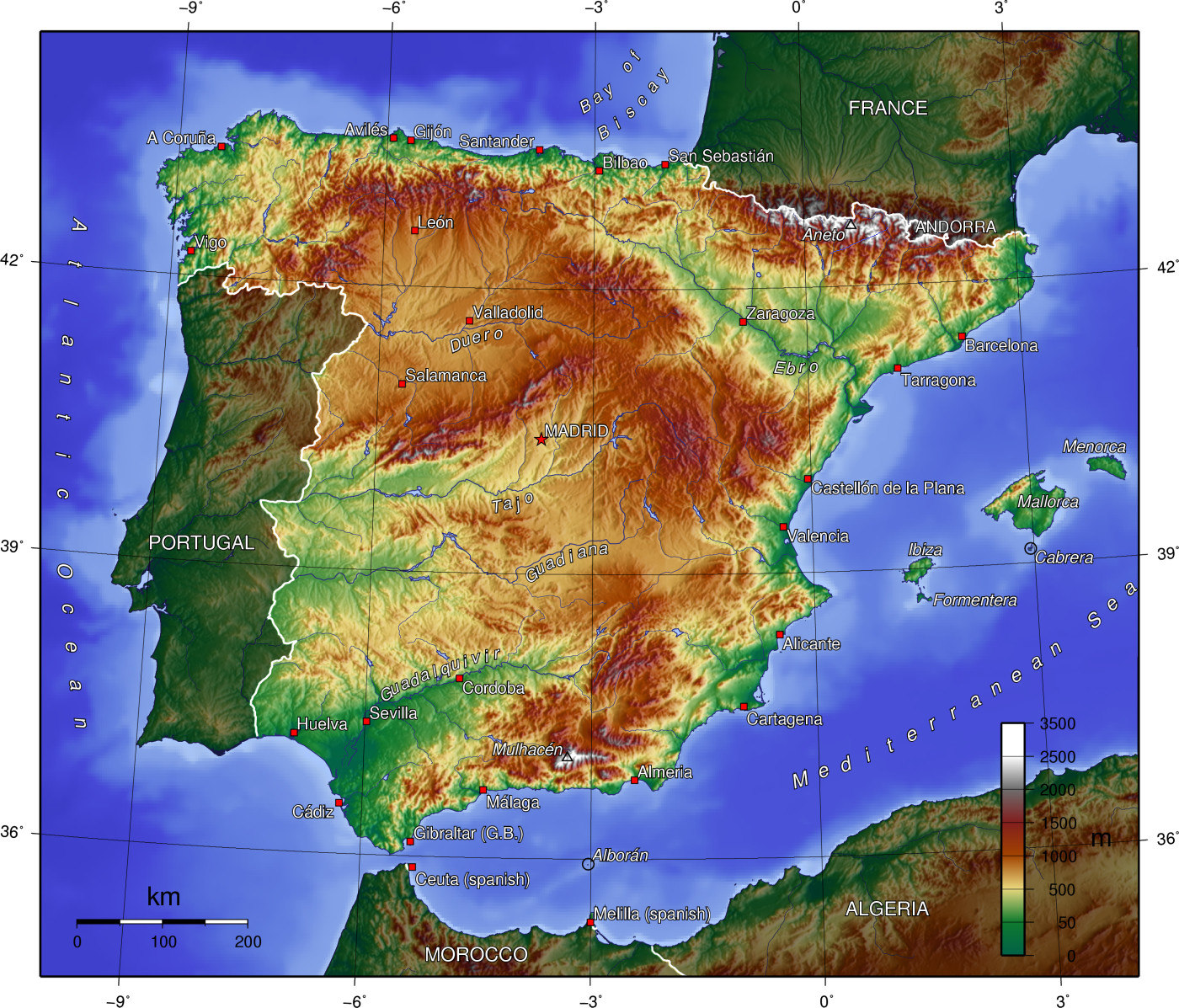
Topographic map of Spain, created with GMT based on NOAA and NASA datasets

Detailed map of Spain, produced by the Instituto Geográfico Nacional in 2000

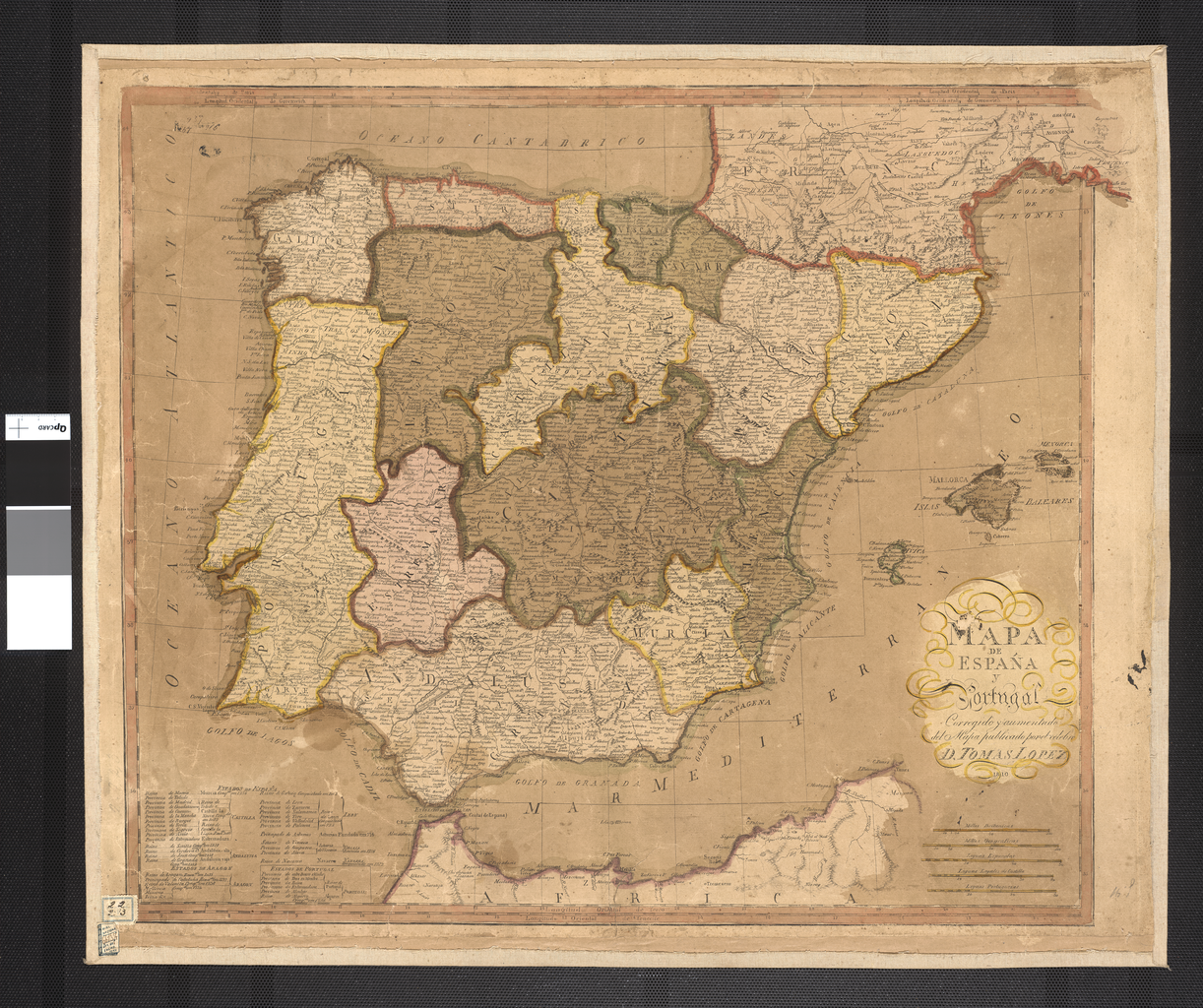
Map of Spain and Portugal, based on the map published by D. Tomas Lopez in 1810

Spain is a transcontinental country located in southwestern Europe and northern Africa, occupying about 84.6% of the Iberian Peninsula. Its territory includes a small exclave inside France called Llívia, the Balearic Islands in the Mediterranean Sea, the Canary Islands in the Atlantic Ocean, and several territories on or near the North African coast, including the autonomous cities of Ceuta and Melilla and the plazas de soberanía (Islas Chafarinas, Isl, Isla Perejil, and Peñón de Vélez de la Gomera).

The Spanish mainland is bordered to the south and east almost entirely by the Mediterranean Sea (except for the small British territory of Gibraltar); to the north by France, Andorra, and the Bay of Biscay; and to the west by the Atlantic Ocean and Portugal. With a land area of 504,782 square kilometres (194,897 mi^{2}) in the Iberian Peninsula, Spain is the largest country in Southern Europe, the second largest country in Western Europe (behind France), and the fourth largest country in the European continent (behind Russia, Ukraine, and France). It has an average altitude of 650 m.

Its total area including Spanish island territories is 505,370 km^{2} (195,124 sq mi) of which 499,542 km^{2} (192,874 sq mi) is land and 5,240 km^{2} (2,023 sq mi) is water. It has the 30th largest Exclusive Economic Zone of 1,039,233 km^{2} (401,250 mi^{2}). Spain lies between latitudes 27° and 44° N, and longitudes 19° W and 5° E. Its Atlantic coast is 710 km (441 mi) long. The Pyrenees mountain range extends 435 km (270 mi) from the Mediterranean to the Bay of Biscay. In the extreme south of Spain's mainland lie the Straits of Gibraltar, which separate the Iberian Peninsula and the rest of Europe from Ceuta and Morocco in North Africa.

== Borders ==
Most of Spain's boundaries are water: the Mediterranean Sea along the east from the French border down to Gibraltar and the Strait of Gibraltar, and the Atlantic Ocean on the northwest and southwest (in the south as the Gulf of Cádiz and in the north as the Bay of Biscay). The Spanish autonomous cities of Ceuta and Melilla are Spanish enclaves lying in mainland Africa in territory claimed by Morocco and are located on the coast of the Alboran Sea, with Ceuta at the very mouth of the Strait of Gibraltar, and Melilla closer to the border with Algeria. The Canary Islands, geographically and geologically part of the African continent, are located in the Atlantic Ocean.

Spain also shares land boundaries with France and Andorra along the Pyrenees in the northeast, with Portugal on the west, with the small British colonial Territory of Gibraltar near the southernmost tip, and with Morocco in its autonomous cities of Ceuta and Melilla, and Peñón de Vélez de la Gomera, a sparsely populated Spanish military enclave connected to mainland via a tombolo. The affiliation of Gibraltar has continued to be a contentious issue between Spain and Britain, and the sovereignty of Spain's enclaves, or plazas de soberanía, on the Mediterranean coast of Morocco is disputed by Madrid.

Spain also has a small exclave inside France called Llívia, which is a mountain village in the historical comarca of La Cerdanya, forming part of the historical territories of Catalonia.

== Regions ==
=== Peninsular region ===
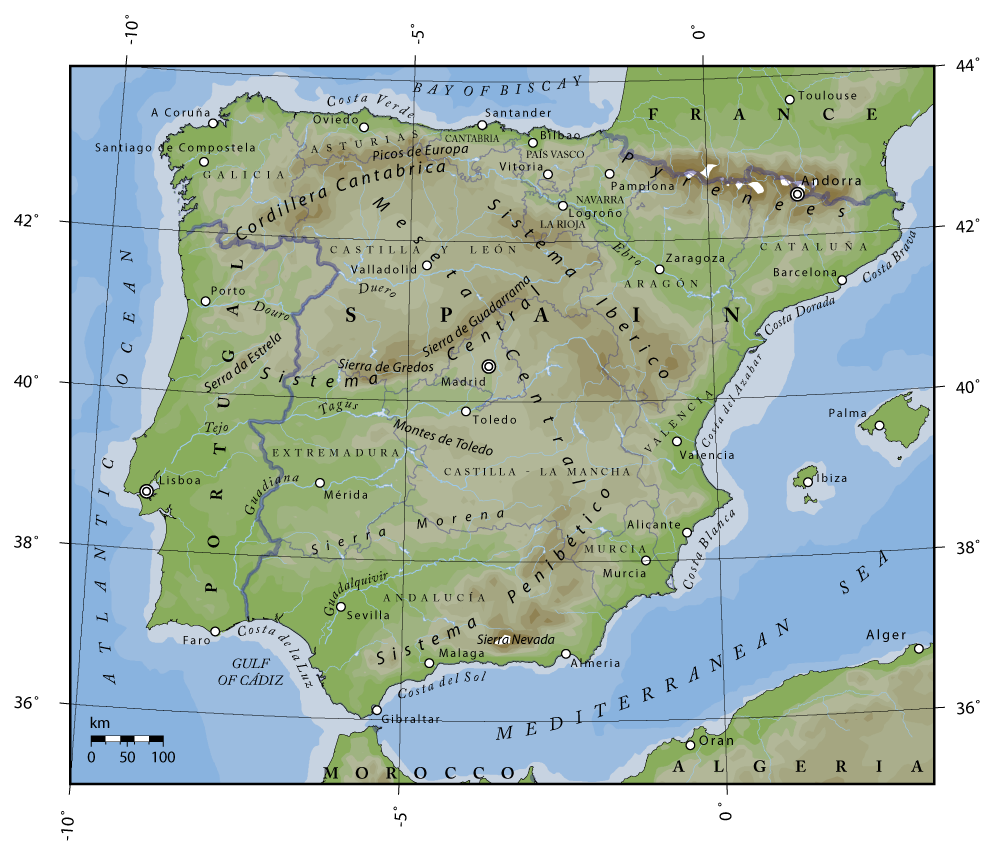
Geophysical map of the peninsular region of Spain, showing major mountain ranges

Most of Spain's peninsular region consists of the Meseta Central, a highland plateau rimmed and dissected by mountain ranges. Other landforms include narrow coastal plains and some lowland river valleys, the most prominent of which is the Andalusian Plain in the southwest. The country can be divided into ten natural regions or subregions: the dominant Meseta Central, the Cantabrian Mountains (Cordillera Cantabrica) and the northwest region, the Ibérico region, the Pyrenees, the Penibético region in the southeast, the Andalusian Plain, the Ebro Basin, the coastal plains, the Balearic Islands, and the Canary Islands. These are commonly grouped into four types: the Meseta Central and associated mountains, other mountainous regions, lowland regions, and islands.

=== The Inner Plateau and associated mountains ===
The Meseta Central ("Inner Plateau") is a vast plateau in the heart of peninsular Spain, which has elevations that range from 610 to 760 m. Rimmed by mountains, the Meseta Central slopes gently to the west and to the series of rivers that form some of the border with Portugal. The Sistema Central, described as the "dorsal spine" of the Meseta Central, divides the Meseta into northern and southern subregions, the former higher in elevation and smaller in area than the latter. The Sistema Central rims the capital city of Madrid with peaks that rise to over 2,400 m within the Madrid region. South-west of Madrid, the Sistema Central shows its highest peak, Pico Almanzor, of almost 2,600 m. The mountains of the Sistema Central, which continue westward into Portugal, display some glacial features; the highest of the peaks are snow-capped for most of the year. Despite their height, however, the mountain system does not create a major barrier between the northern and the southern portions of the Meseta Central because several passes permit road and railroad transportation to the northwest and the northeast.

The southern portion of the Meseta (Spanish: Submeseta Sur) is further divided by twin mountain ranges, the Montes de Toledo running to the east with the Sierra de Guadalupe, to the west. Their peaks do not rise much higher than 1,500 m. With many easy passes, including those that connect the Meseta with the Andalusian Plain, the Montes de Toledo and the Sierra de Guadalupe do not present an obstacle to transportation and communication. The two mountain ranges are separated from the Sistema Central by the Tagus River.

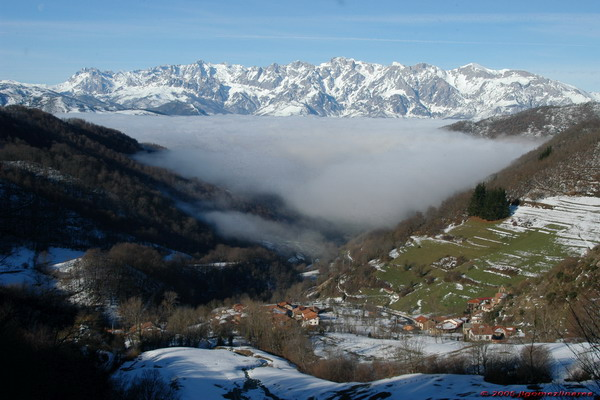
The Picos de Europa in Northern Spain

The mountain regions that rim the Meseta Central and are associated with it are the Sierra Morena, the Cordillera Cantábrica, and the Sistema Ibérico. Forming the southern edge of the Meseta Central, the Sierra Morena merges in the east with the southern extension of the Sistema Iberico and reaches westward along the northern edge of the Rio Guadalquivir valley to join the mountains in southern Portugal. The massif of the Sierra Morena extends northward to the Río Guadiana, which separates it from the Sistema Central. Despite their relatively low elevations, seldom surpassing 1,300 m, the mountains of the Sierra Morena are rugged at their southern edge.

The Cordillera Cantábrica, a limestone formation, runs parallel to, and close to, the northern coast near the Bay of Biscay. Its highest points are the Picos de Europa, surpassing 2,500 m. The Cordillera Cantábrica extends 182 km and abruptly drops 1,500 m some 30 km from the coast. To the west lie the hills of the northwest region and to the east the Basque Mountains that link them to the Pyrenees.

The Sistema Ibérico extends from the Cordillera Cantábrica southeastward and, close to the Mediterranean, spreads out from the Río Ebro to the Río Júcar. The barren, rugged slopes of this mountain range cover an area of close to 21,000 square kilometers. The mountains exceed 2,000 m in their northern region and reach a maximum height of over 2,300 m east of the headwaters of the Rio Duero. The extremely steep mountain slopes in this range are often cut by deep, narrow gorges.

=== Lowland regions ===
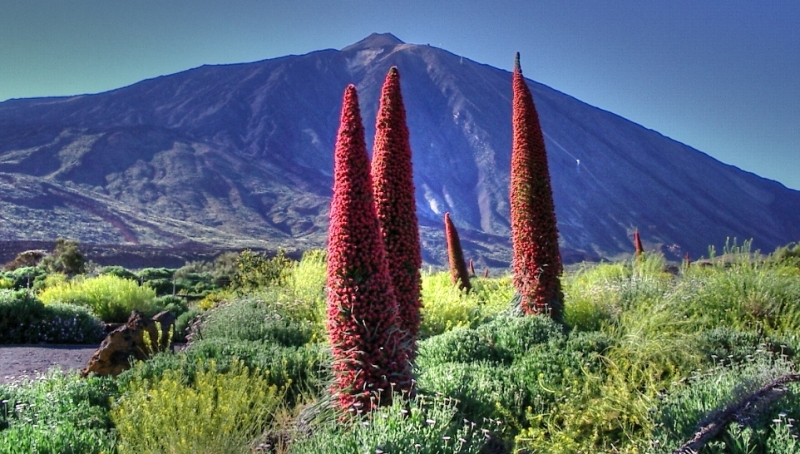
Teide, the highest mountain in Spain (Tenerife, Canary Islands)

The major lowland regions are the Andalusian Plain in the southwest, the Ebro Basin in the northeast, and the coastal plains. The Andalusian Plain is essentially a wide river valley through which the Río Guadalquivir flows. The river broadens out along its course, reaching its widest point at the Golfo de Cadiz. The Andalusian Plain is bounded on the north by the Sierra Morena and on the south by the Sistema Penibético; it narrows to an apex in the east where these two mountain chains meet. The Ebro Basin is formed by the Río Ebro valley, contained by mountains on three sides—the Sistema Ibérico to the south and west, the Pyrenees to the north and east, and their coastal extensions paralleling the shore to the east. Minor low-lying river valleys close to the Portuguese border are located on the Tagus and the Río Guadiana.

The Coastal Plains regions are narrow strips between the coastal mountains and the seas. They are broadest along the Golfo de Cádiz, where the coastal plain adjoins the Andalusian Plain, and along the southern and central eastern coasts. The narrowest coastal plain runs along the Bay of Biscay, where the Cordillera Cantábrica ends close to shore.

=== The islands ===
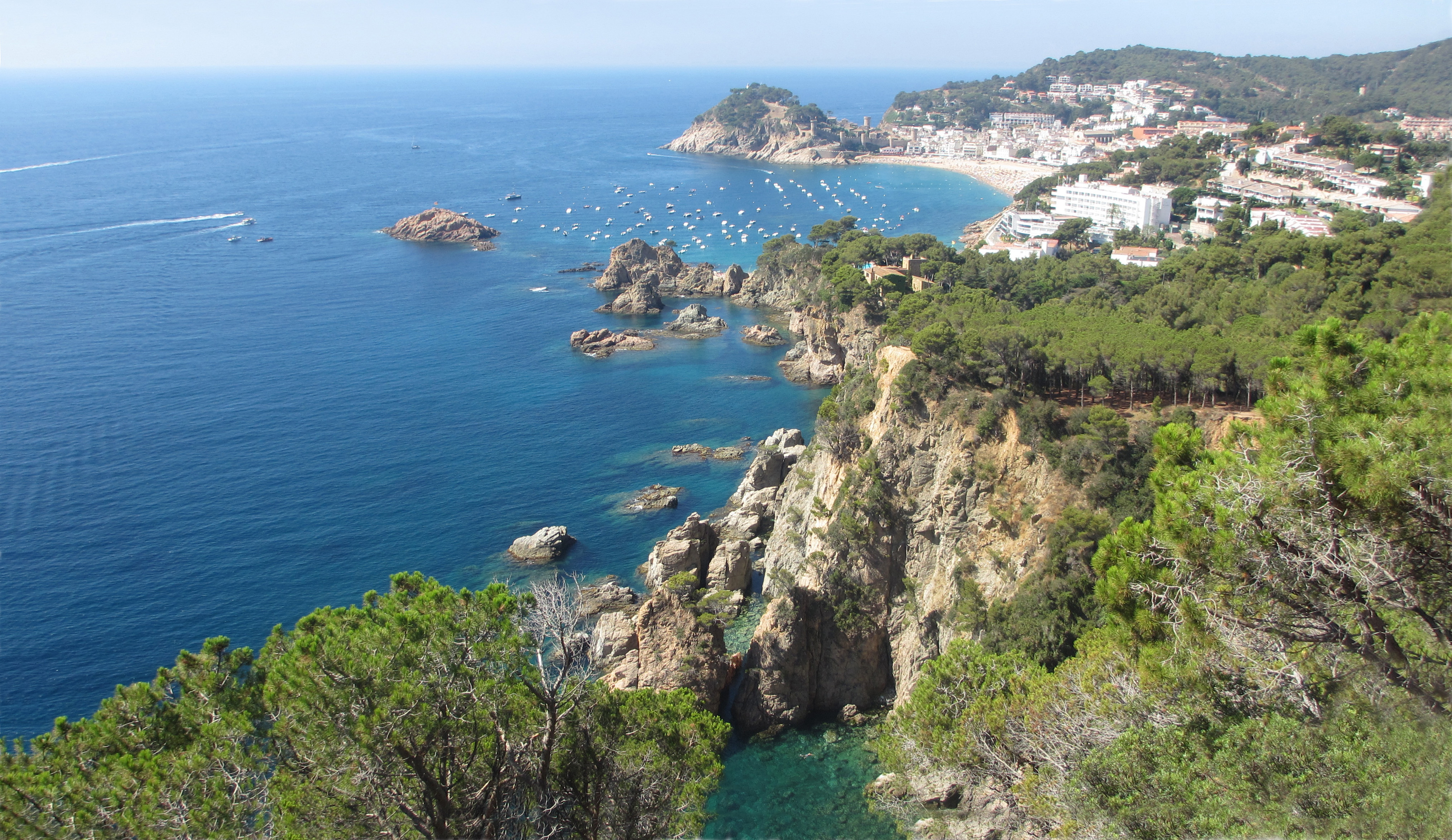
The Mediterranean coast of Spain

The remaining regions of Spain are the Balearic Islands and the Canary Islands, the former located in the Mediterranean Sea and the latter in the Atlantic Ocean. The Balearic Islands, encompassing a total area of 5,000 square kilometers, lie 80 kilometers off Spain's central eastern coast. The mountains that rise up above the Mediterranean Sea to form these islands are an extension of the Sistema Penibetico. The archipelago's highest points, which reach 1,400 meters, are in northwestern Mallorca, close to the coast. The central portion of Mallorca is a plain, bounded on the east and the southeast by broken hills.

The Canary Islands, ninety kilometers off the west coast of Africa, are of volcanic origin. The large central islands, Tenerife and Gran Canaria, have the highest peaks. Pico de Las Nieves, on Gran Canaria, rises to 1,949 meters, and the Teide, on Tenerife, to 3,718 meters. Teide, a dormant volcano, is the highest peak of Spain and the third largest volcano in the world from its base.

== Drainage, floods, and water stress ==
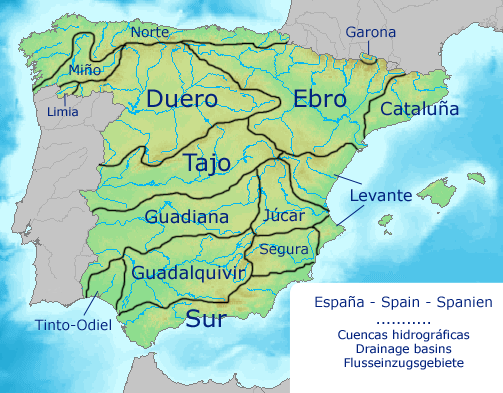
River basins of continental Spain

Of the roughly 1,800 rivers and streams in Spain, only the Tagus is more than 960 kilometers long; all but 90 extend less than 96 kilometers. These shorter rivers carry small volumes of water on an irregular basis, and they have seasonally dry river beds; however, when they do flow, they often are swift and torrential. Most major rivers rise in the mountains rimming or dissecting the Meseta Central and flow westward across the plateau through Portugal to empty into the Atlantic Ocean. One significant exception is the Ebro, which flows eastward to the Mediterranean. Rivers in the extreme northwest and in the narrow northern coastal plain drain directly into the Atlantic Ocean. The northwestern coastline is also truncated by rias, waterbodies similar to fjords.

The major rivers flowing westward throughout the Meseta Central include the Duero, the Tagus, the Guadiana, and the Guadalquivir. The Rio Guadalquivir is one of the most significant rivers in Spain because it irrigates a fertile valley, thus creating a rich agricultural area, and because it is navigable inland, making Seville the only inland river port for ocean-going traffic in Spain. The major river in the northwest region is the Miño.

El Atazar Dam is a major dam built near Madrid to provide a water supply.

=== Floods and erosion ===
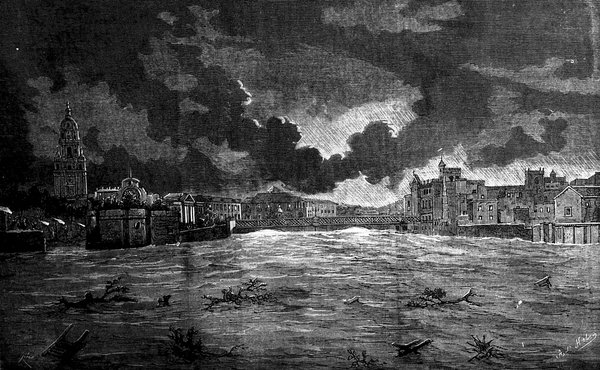
Santa Teresa flood.

Certain Spanish regions can be considered vulnerable to both flooding and erosion.

- 15 October 1879, in Murcia, Santa Teresa flood.
- 13–15 October 1957, in Valencia, torrential rain results in a devastating flood, at least 81 people lost their lives.
- In 1982, the river Jucar (Valencia, Spain) broke the Tous Reservoir causing a flood that killed 30 people.

=== Water stress ===
Water stress or water lack, poses the greatest threat in Spain. Water scarcity is a significant issue in many regions throughout Spain and climate change may aggravate the problem, with longer periods of dry weather. Supply problems regularly occur in the Jucar basin during summer. In the Segura basin, water scarcity has resulted in an increase of the water prices by 30% for households. Overall, the regions in the south-east of Spain are particularly vulnerable to water shortages. Furthermore, large areas of the Mediterranean are affected by saltwater intrusion.

== Climate ==
Spain map of Köppen climate classification.

Peninsular Spain experiences four principal climatic types: semi-arid, arid, maritime, and Mediterranean.

The locally generated steppe climate covers the majority of peninsular Spain, influencing the Meseta Central, the adjoining mountains to the east and the south, and the Ebro Basin. This climate is characterized by wide diurnal and seasonal variations in temperature and by low, irregular rainfall with high rates of evaporation that leave the land arid. Annual rainfall generally is 30 to 64 centimetres (12 to 25 in); most of the Meseta region receives about 50 centimetres (20 in). The northern Meseta, the Sistema Central, and the Ebro Basin have wetter seasons, one in spring (April–May) and the other in autumn (October–November), with late spring being the wettest time of the year. In the southern Meseta, also, the wettest seasons are spring and autumn, but the spring one is earlier (March), and the autumn one is later (September). Even during the spring and autumn seasons, rain is irregular and unreliable. Winters in these regions are cold, with strong winds and high humidity, despite the low precipitation. Except for mountain areas, the northern foothills of the Sistema Iberico are the coldest area, and frost is common. Summers are hot and cloudless, producing average daytime temperatures that reach the mid- or upper 30s °C (low 90s to low 100s °F) in the northern Meseta and the upper 30s °C (upper 90s to low 100s °F) in the southern Meseta; nighttime temperatures, however, drop to the upper teens °C (low to mid 60s °F). The Ebro Basin, at a lower altitude, is extremely hot during the summer, and temperatures can exceed 43 °C (109 °F). Summer humidities are low in the Meseta Central and in the Ebro Basin, except right along the shores of in the Rio Ebro, where humidity is high.

A maritime climate prevails in the northern part of the country, from the Pyrenees to the northwest region, characterized by relatively mild winters, warm but not hot summers, and generally abundant rainfall spread out over the year. Temperatures vary only slightly, both on a diurnal and a seasonal basis. The moderating effects of the sea, however, abate in22 to 27 °C (72 to 81 °F) on the coast and 29 to 31 °C (84 to 88 °F)

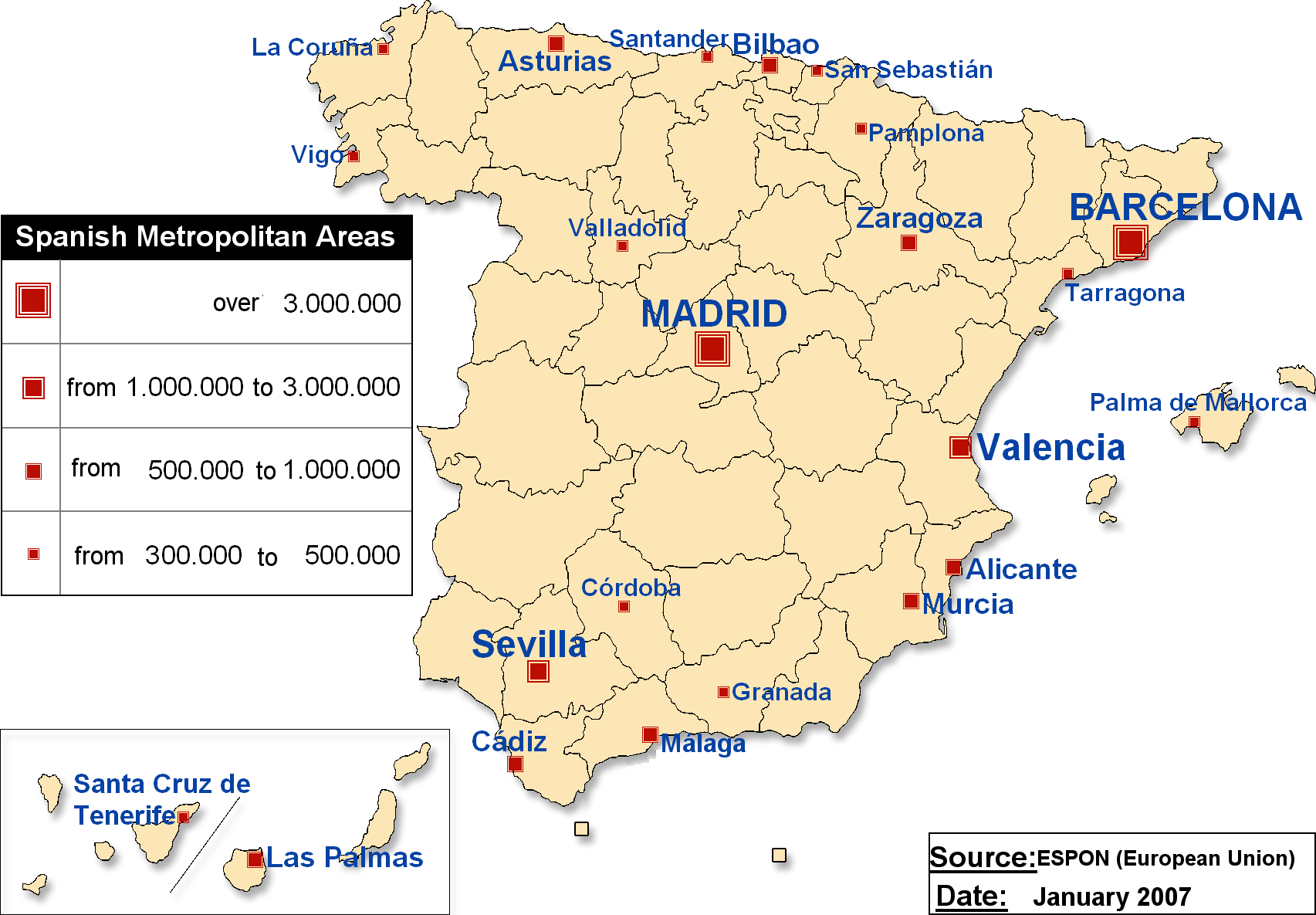
Main metropolitan areas in Spain

The most populous cities in Spain are Madrid (3.3 million), Barcelona (1.6 million), Valencia (790,000), and Seville (690,000; all data as of 2019).

== Resources and land use ==
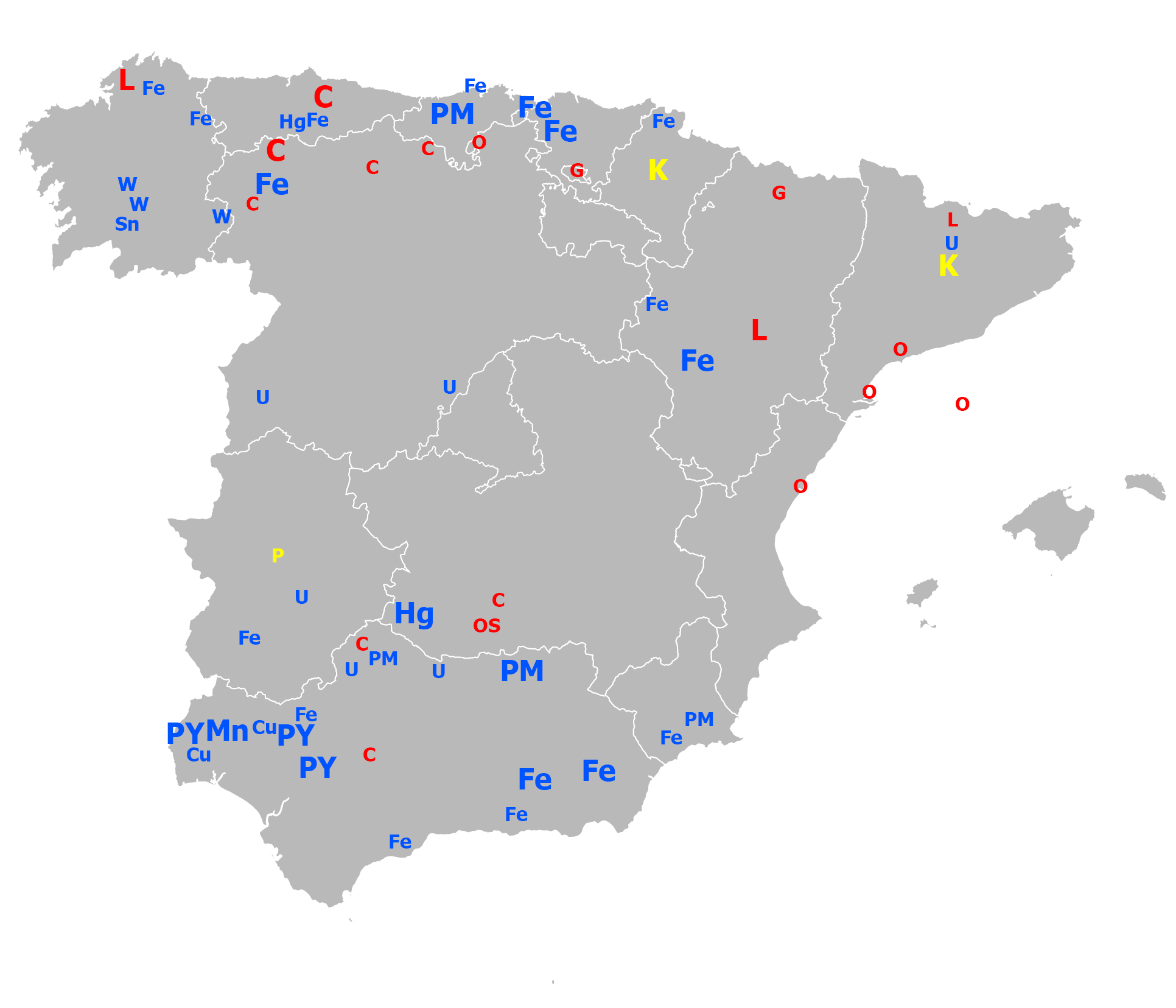
Natural resources of Spain. Metals are in blue: Fe — iron ore, Cu — copper, Sn — tin, Hg — mercury, W — tungsten, U — uranium, PM for polymetals (Pb, Zn and others), PY for pyrite. Fossil fuels are in red: C — coal, L — lignite, O — oil, G — natural gas, OS — oil shale. In yellow: K — potash, P — phosphorite.

Natural resources: coal, lignite, iron ore, uranium, mercury, pyrites, fluorspar, gypsum, zinc, lead, tungsten, copper, kaolin, potash, sepiolite, hydropower, arable land

Land use:

- Arable land: 27.18%
- Permanent crops: 9.85%
- Other: 62.97% (2005)

Irrigated land: 38,000 km^{2} (2003)

Total renewable water resources: 111.1 cubic metres (2005)

Freshwater withdrawal (domestic/industrial/agricultural):

total: 37.22 cu km/yr (13%/19%/68%)
per capita: 864 cu m/yr (2002)

== Maritime claims ==
- Contiguous zone: 24 nmi (44.4 km; 27.6 mi)
- Exclusive economic zone: 1,039,233 km^{2} (401,250 mi^{2}) with 200 nmi (370.4 km; 230.2 mi) (applies only to the Atlantic Ocean)
- Territorial sea: 12 nmi (22.2 km; 13.8 mi)

== See also ==
- Autonomous communities of Spain
- Comarcas of Spain
- List of extreme points of Spain
- Provinces of Spain
- Topographical relief of Spain
