= District One (Regional Assembly of Murcia constituency) =

- Former Regional Assembly of Murcia; Electoral constituency
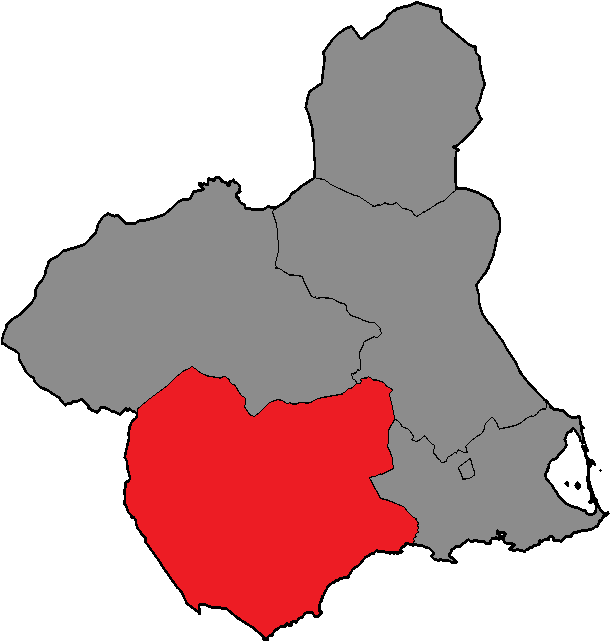
- Location of the District One within the Region of Murcia
- Province: Murcia
- Autonomous community: Region of Murcia

Former constituency
- Created: 1983
- Abolished: 2015
- Seats: 7

District One was one of the five constituencies (Spanish: circunscripciones) represented in the Regional Assembly of Murcia, the regional legislature of the Region of Murcia. The constituency elected seven deputies. It comprised the municipalities of Lorca, Aguilas, Puerto Lumbreras, Totana, Alhama de Murcia, Librilla, Aledo and Mazarrón. The electoral system used the D'Hondt method and a closed-list proportional representation, with a minimum threshold of five percent regionally.

== Electoral system ==
The constituency was created as per the Statute of Autonomy for the Region of Murcia of 1982 and was first contested in the 1983 regional election. The Statute provided for sub-provincial divisions of the Principality's territory to be established as multi-member districts in the Regional Assembly of Murcia, with this regulation being maintained under the 1986 regional electoral law. Each constituency was entitled to an initial minimum of one seat, with the remaining 40 being distributed in proportion to their populations. The exception was the 1983 election, when constituencies were allocated one fixed member and one additional member per each 25,000 inhabitants or fraction greater than 12,500.

Voting was on the basis of universal suffrage, which comprised all nationals over eighteen, registered in the Region of Murcia and in full enjoyment of their political rights. Amendments to the electoral law in 2011 required for Murcians abroad to apply for voting before being permitted to vote, a system known as "begged" or expat vote (Spanish: Voto rogado). Seats were elected using the D'Hondt method and a closed list proportional representation, with an electoral threshold of five percent of valid votes—which included blank ballots—being applied regionally. The use of the D'Hondt method might result in a higher effective threshold, depending on the district magnitude.

The electoral law allowed for parties and federations registered in the interior ministry, coalitions and groupings of electors to present lists of candidates. Parties and federations intending to form a coalition ahead of an election were required to inform the relevant Electoral Commission within ten days of the election call—fifteen before 1985—whereas groupings of electors needed to secure the signature of at least two percent of the electorate in the constituencies for which they sought election—one-thousandth of the electorate, with a compulsory minimum of 500 signatures, until 1985—disallowing electors from signing for more than one list of candidates.

A 2015 legal amendment saw the abolition of the five constituencies and their replacement by a single multi-member district comprising all the municipalities in the autonomous community. The electoral threshold was also lowered from five to three percent.

== Deputies ==
Deputies 1983–2015
Key to parties IU Podemos PSOE PP CP AP
Assembly	Election	Distribution
1st	1983	5 / 2
2nd	1987	5 / 2
3rd	1991	1 / 4 / 2
4th	1995	1 / 3 / 3
5th	1999	3 / 4
6th	2003	3 / 4
7th	2007	2 / 5
8th	2011	2 / 5
9th	2015	1 / 2 / 4

== Regional elections ==
=== 2015 ===
Summary of the 24 May 2015 Regional Assembly of Murcia election results in District One
Parties and alliances	Popular vote			Seats	
Parties and alliances	Votes	%	±pp	Total	+/−
People's Party (PP)	38,950	41.64	–15.55	4	–1
Spanish Socialist Workers' Party (PSOE)	26,251	28.06	+1.37	2	±0
We Can (Podemos)	9,488	10.14	New	1	+1
Winning the Region of Murcia: Plural Left (IU–V–RM–CLI–AS)^{1}	7,131	7.62	–1.94	0	±0
Citizens–Party of the Citizenry (C's)	6,888	7.36	New	0	±0
Citizens of Democratic Centre (CCD)	900	0.96	New	0	±0
Union, Progress and Democracy (UPyD)	722	0.77	–1.68	0	±0
Animalist Party Against Mistreatment of Animals (PACMA)	631	0.67	New	0	±0
Vox (Vox)	379	0.41	New	0	±0
Blank Seats (EB)	309	0.33	New	0	±0
Zero Cuts (Recortes Cero)	197	0.21	New	0	±0
Citizens' Democratic Renewal Movement (RED)	80	0.09	New	0	±0
Spain on the Move (LEM)	74	0.08	New	0	±0
Centre and Democracy Forum (CyD)	72	0.08	–0.05	0	±0
Blank ballots	1,468	1.57	–0.26		
Total	93,540			7	±0
Valid votes	93,540	97.87	–0.60		
Invalid votes	2,039	2.13	+0.60		
Votes cast / turnout	95,579	62.35	–4.08		
Abstentions		37.65	+4.08		
Registered voters					
Sources
Footnotes: ^{1} Winning the Region of Murcia: Plural Left results are compared to United Left–Greens of the Region of Murcia totals in the 2011 election.

=== 2011 ===
Summary of the 22 May 2011 Regional Assembly of Murcia election results in District One
Parties and alliances	Popular vote			Seats	
Parties and alliances	Votes	%	±pp	Total	+/−
People's Party (PP)	55,637	57.19	+1.95	5	±0
Spanish Socialist Workers' Party (PSOE)	25,963	26.69	–6.33	2	±0
United Left–Greens of the Region of Murcia (IU–V–RM)	9,303	9.56	+0.98	0	±0
Union, Progress and Democracy (UPyD)	2,381	2.45	New	0	±0
The Greens of the Region of Murcia–Ecolo (LV–Ecolo)	982	1.01	New	0	±0
Liberal Democratic Centre (CDL)	685	0.70	+0.02	0	±0
Party for the Regeneration of Democracy in Spain (PRDE)	151	0.16	New	0	±0
Centre and Democracy Forum (CyD)	129	0.13	New	0	±0
Employment Business Party (PEE)	116	0.12	New	0	±0
Communist Unification of Spain (UCE)	97	0.10	New	0	±0
State Reform of Nostradamus (REN)	56	0.06	New	0	±0
Blank ballots	1,781	1.83	+0.49		
Total	97,281			7	±0
Valid votes	97,281	98.47	–0.16		
Invalid votes	1,513	1.53	+0.16		
Votes cast / turnout	98,794	66.43	–4.01		
Abstentions		33.57	+4.01		
Registered voters					

=== 2007 ===
Summary of the 27 May 2007 Regional Assembly of Murcia election results in District One
Parties and alliances	Popular vote			Seats	
Parties and alliances	Votes	%	±pp	Total	+/−
People's Party (PP)	55,534	55.24	+6.14	5	+1
Spanish Socialist Workers' Party (PSOE)	33,197	33.02	–7.68	2	–1
United Left–The Greens of the Region of Murcia (IU–LV–RM)^{1}	8,629	8.58	–0.05	0	±0
Regional Citizens' Coalition (CCR)	836	0.83	New	0	±0
Liberal Democratic Centre (CDL)	681	0.68	New	0	±0
Spanish Phalanx of the CNSO (FE–JONS)	183	0.18	New	0	±0
Centrist Party (PCTR)	124	0.12	New	0	±0
Blank ballots	1,343	1.34	+0.08		
Total	100,527			7	±0
Valid votes	100,527	98.63	–0.24		
Invalid votes	1,394	1.37	+0.24		
Votes cast / turnout	101,921	70.44	+0.47		
Abstentions		29.56	–0.47		
Registered voters					
Sources
Footnotes: ^{1} United Left–The Greens of the Region of Murcia results are compared to the combined totals of United Left and The Greens in the 2003 election.

=== 2003 ===
Summary of the 25 May 2003 Regional Assembly of Murcia election results in District One
Parties and alliances	Popular vote			Seats	
Parties and alliances	Votes	%	±pp	Total	+/−
People's Party (PP)	47,888	49.10	+5.62	4	+1
Spanish Socialist Workers' Party (PSOE)	39,695	40.70	–2.89	3	–1
United Left of the Region of Murcia (IURM)	7,505	7.69	–0.61	0	±0
The Greens (LV)	914	0.94	+0.30	0	±0
Citizens' Convergence of the South-East (CCSE)	311	0.32	New	0	±0
Blank ballots	1,225	1.26	–0.04		
Total	97,538			7	±0
Valid votes	97,538	98.87	–0.25		
Invalid votes	1,111	1.13	+0.25		
Votes cast / turnout	98,649	69.97	±0.00		
Abstentions		30.03	±0.00		
Registered voters					

=== 1999 ===
Summary of the 13 June 1999 Regional Assembly of Murcia election results in District One
Parties and alliances	Popular vote			Seats	
Parties and alliances	Votes	%	±pp	Total	+/−
Spanish Socialist Workers' Party (PSOE)	41,591	43.59	+4.30	4	+1
People's Party (PP)	41,485	43.48	–1.38	3	±0
United Left of the Region of Murcia (IURM)	7,923	8.30	–4.52	0	–1
Spanish Democratic Party (PADE)	2,069	2.17	New	0	±0
The Greens (LV)	607	0.64	New	0	±0
Union of the Peoples of Murcia (UPM)	262	0.27	New	0	±0
Centrist Union–Democratic and Social Centre (UC–CDS)	233	0.24	–0.22	0	±0
Blank ballots	1,240	1.30	–0.06		
Total	95,410			7	±0
Valid votes	95,410	99.12	+0.60		
Invalid votes	845	0.88	–0.60		
Votes cast / turnout	96,255	69.97	–1.91		
Abstentions		30.03	+1.91		
Registered voters					

=== 1995 ===
Summary of the 28 May 1995 Regional Assembly of Murcia election results in District One
Parties and alliances	Popular vote			Seats	
Parties and alliances	Votes	%	±pp	Total	+/−
People's Party (PP)	41,956	44.86	+17.98	3	+1
Spanish Socialist Workers' Party (PSOE)	36,744	39.29	–13.85	3	–1
United Left–The Greens of the Region of Murcia (IU–LV–RM)^{1}	11,991	12.82	+0.66	1	±0
Centrist Union–Democratic and Social Centre (UC–CDS)	428	0.46	–4.18	0	±0
Regional Murcianist Party (PMR)	416	0.44	New	0	±0
Democratic Bloc (BD)	344	0.37	New	0	±0
New Region (NR)	226	0.24	New	0	±0
Cantonal Party (PCAN)	144	0.15	–0.98	0	±0
Blank ballots	1,272	1.36	+0.26		
Total	93,521			7	±0
Valid votes	93,521	98.52	+0.26		
Invalid votes	1,408	1.48	–0.26		
Votes cast / turnout	94,929	71.88	+3.35		
Abstentions		28.12	–3.35		
Registered voters					
Sources
Footnotes: ^{1} United Left–The Greens of the Region of Murcia results are compared to the combined totals of United Left and The Greens in the 1991 election.

=== 1991 ===
Summary of the 26 May 1991 Regional Assembly of Murcia election results in District One
Parties and alliances	Popular vote			Seats	
Parties and alliances	Votes	%	±pp	Total	+/−
Spanish Socialist Workers' Party (PSOE)	41,804	53.14	+0.83	4	–1
People's Party (PP)^{1}	21,147	26.88	+0.78	2	±0
United Left (IU)	8,963	11.39	+2.14	1	+1
Democratic and Social Centre (CDS)	3,646	4.64	–5.54	0	±0
Regional Electoral Coalition (PCAN–PRM)^{2}	888	1.13	+0.53	0	±0
The Greens (LV)	609	0.77	New	0	±0
The Greens Ecologist–Humanist List (LVLE–H)^{3}	397	0.50	+0.17	0	±0
Rainbow (Arcoiris)	340	0.43	New	0	±0
Blank ballots	868	1.10	–0.14		
Total	78,662			7	±0
Valid votes	78,662	98.26	–0.22		
Invalid votes	1,389	1.74	+0.22		
Votes cast / turnout	80,051	68.53	–4.10		
Abstentions		31.47	+4.10		
Registered voters					
Sources
Footnotes: ^{1} People's Party results are compared to People's Alliance totals in the 1987 election.; ^{2} Regional Electoral Coalition results are compared to the combined totals of Cantonal Party and Murcian Regionalist Party in the 1987 election.; ^{3} The Greens Ecologist–Humanist List results are compared to Humanist Platform totals in the 1987 election.

=== 1987 ===
Summary of the 10 June 1987 Regional Assembly of Murcia election results in District One
Parties and alliances	Popular vote			Seats	
Parties and alliances	Votes	%	±pp	Total	+/−
Spanish Socialist Workers' Party (PSOE)	39,175	52.31	–8.08	5	±0
People's Alliance (AP)^{1}	19,544	26.10	–3.97	2	±0
Democratic and Social Centre (CDS)	7,624	10.18	New	0	±0
United Left (IU)^{2}	6,930	9.25	+2.40	0	±0
Humanist Platform (PH)	246	0.33	New	0	±0
Murcian Regionalist Party (PRM)	223	0.30	New	0	±0
Cantonal Party (PCAN)	222	0.30	+0.03	0	±0
Blank ballots	931	1.24	+0.74		
Total	74,895			7	±0
Valid votes	74,895	98.48	–0.52		
Invalid votes	1,158	1.52	+0.52		
Votes cast / turnout	76,053	72.63	+3.41		
Abstentions	28,658	27.37	–3.41		
Registered voters	104,711				
Sources
Footnotes: ^{1} People's Alliance results are compared to People's Coalition totals in the 1983 election.; ^{2} United Left results are compared to Communist Party of Spain totals in the 1983 election.

=== 1983 ===
Summary of the 8 May 1983 Regional Assembly of Murcia election results in District One
Parties and alliances	Popular vote			Seats	
Parties and alliances	Votes	%	±pp	Total	+/−
Spanish Socialist Workers' Party (PSOE)	41,294	60.39	n/a	5	n/a
People's Coalition (AP–PDP–UL)	20,562	30.07	n/a	2	n/a
Communist Party of Spain (PCE)	4,684	6.85	n/a	0	n/a
Liberal Democratic Party (PDL)	1,307	1.91	n/a	0	n/a
Cantonal Party (PCAN)	187	0.27	n/a	0	n/a
Blank ballots	343	0.50	n/a		
Total	68,377			7	n/a
Valid votes	68,377	99.00	n/a		
Invalid votes	693	1.00	n/a		
Votes cast / turnout	69,070	69.22	n/a		
Abstentions	30,708	30.78	n/a		
Registered voters	99,778				
