= District Two (Regional Assembly of Murcia constituency) =

- Former Regional Assembly of Murcia; Electoral constituency
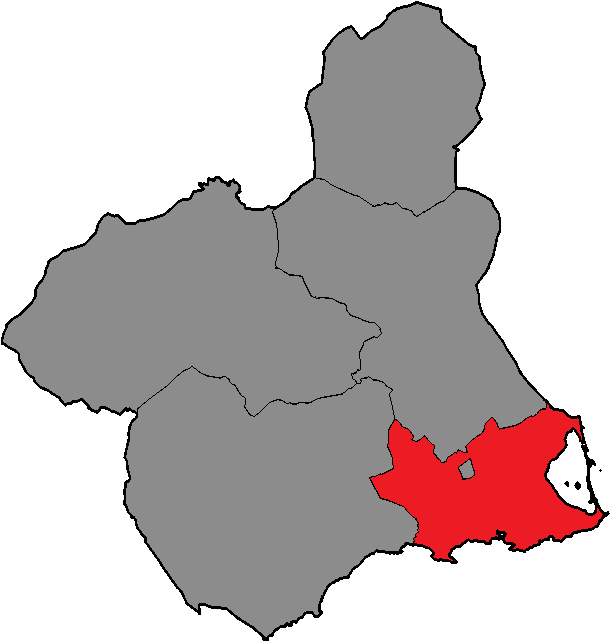
- Location of the District Two within the Region of Murcia
- Province: Murcia
- Autonomous community: Region of Murcia

Former constituency
- Created: 1983
- Abolished: 2015
- Seats: 10 (1983–2007); 11 (2007–2011); 10 (2011–2015); 11 (2015)

District Two was one of the five constituencies (Spanish: circunscripciones) represented in the Regional Assembly of Murcia, the regional legislature of the Region of Murcia. The constituency last elected 11 deputies in 2015. It comprised the municipalities of Cartagena, La Unión, Fuente Alamo de Murcia, Torre-Pacheco, San Javier, San Pedro del Pinatar and Los Alcázares. The electoral system used the D'Hondt method and a closed-list proportional representation, with a minimum threshold of five percent regionally.

== Electoral system ==
The constituency was created as per the Statute of Autonomy for the Region of Murcia of 1982 and was first contested in the 1983 regional election. The Statute provided for sub-provincial divisions of the Principality's territory to be established as multi-member districts in the Regional Assembly of Murcia, with this regulation being maintained under the 1986 regional electoral law. Each constituency was entitled to an initial minimum of one seat, with the remaining 40 being distributed in proportion to their populations. The exception was the 1983 election, when constituencies were allocated one fixed member and one additional member per each 25,000 inhabitants or fraction greater than 12,500.

Voting was on the basis of universal suffrage, which comprised all nationals over eighteen, registered in the Region of Murcia and in full enjoyment of their political rights. Amendments to the electoral law in 2011 required for Murcians abroad to apply for voting before being permitted to vote, a system known as "begged" or expat vote (Spanish: Voto rogado). Seats were elected using the D'Hondt method and a closed list proportional representation, with an electoral threshold of five percent of valid votes—which included blank ballots—being applied regionally. The use of the D'Hondt method might result in a higher effective threshold, depending on the district magnitude.

The electoral law allowed for parties and federations registered in the interior ministry, coalitions and groupings of electors to present lists of candidates. Parties and federations intending to form a coalition ahead of an election were required to inform the relevant Electoral Commission within ten days of the election call—fifteen before 1985—whereas groupings of electors needed to secure the signature of at least two percent of the electorate in the constituencies for which they sought election—one-thousandth of the electorate, with a compulsory minimum of 500 signatures, until 1985—disallowing electors from signing for more than one list of candidates.

A 2015 legal amendment saw the abolition of the five constituencies and their replacement by a single multi-member district comprising all the municipalities in the autonomous community. The electoral threshold was also lowered from five to three percent.

== Deputies ==
Deputies 1983–2015
Key to parties IU Podemos PSOE CDS C's PP CP AP
Assembly	Election	Distribution
1st	1983	6 / 4
2nd	1987	5 / 1 / 4
3rd	1991	1 / 5 / 4
4th	1995	1 / 3 / 6
5th	1999	4 / 6
6th	2003	3 / 7
7th	2007	4 / 7
8th	2011	2 / 8
9th	2015	2 / 3 / 1 / 5

== Regional elections ==
=== 2015 ===
Summary of the 24 May 2015 Regional Assembly of Murcia election results in District Two
Parties and alliances	Popular vote			Seats	
Parties and alliances	Votes	%	±pp	Total	+/−
People's Party (PP)	48,126	35.17	–25.68	5	–3
Spanish Socialist Workers' Party (PSOE)	28,796	21.05	–0.33	3	+1
We Can (Podemos)	20,064	14.66	New	2	+2
Citizens–Party of the Citizenry (C's)	18,299	13.37	New	1	+1
Citizens' Movement of Cartagena (MCC)	8,793	6.43	New	0	±0
Winning the Region of Murcia: Plural Left (IU–V–RM–CLI–AS)^{1}	4,566	3.34	–3.58	0	±0
Union, Progress and Democracy (UPyD)	2,299	1.68	–3.59	0	±0
Vox (Vox)	1,478	1.08	New	0	±0
Citizens of Democratic Centre (CCD)	1,061	0.78	New	0	±0
Blank Seats (EB)	579	0.42	New	0	±0
Zero Cuts (Recortes Cero)	410	0.30	New	0	±0
Citizens' Democratic Renewal Movement (RED)	190	0.14	New	0	±0
Blank ballots	2,163	1.58	–0.71		
Total	136,824			11	+1
Valid votes	136,824	97.61	–0.77		
Invalid votes	3,345	2.39	+0.77		
Votes cast / turnout	140,169	58.77	–1.43		
Abstentions		41.23	+1.43		
Registered voters					
Sources
Footnotes: ^{1} Winning the Region of Murcia: Plural Left results are compared to United Left–Greens of the Region of Murcia totals in the 2011 election.

=== 2011 ===
Summary of the 22 May 2011 Regional Assembly of Murcia election results in District Two
Parties and alliances	Popular vote			Seats	
Parties and alliances	Votes	%	±pp	Total	+/−
People's Party (PP)	83,037	60.85	+3.43	8	+1
Spanish Socialist Workers' Party (PSOE)	29,179	21.38	–10.78	2	–2
United Left–Greens of the Region of Murcia (IU–V–RM)	9,437	6.92	+2.21	0	±0
Union, Progress and Democracy (UPyD)	7,190	5.27	New	0	±0
Liberal Democratic Centre (CDL)	1,896	1.39	+0.39	0	±0
The Greens of the Region of Murcia–Ecolo (LV–Ecolo)	481	0.35	New	0	±0
The Phalanx (FE)	417	0.31	New	0	±0
National Democracy (DN)	315	0.23	–0.03	0	±0
Employment Business Party (PEE)	306	0.22	New	0	±0
Party for the Regeneration of Democracy in Spain (PRDE)	260	0.19	New	0	±0
State Reform of Nostradamus (REN)	201	0.15	New	0	±0
Citizens' Convergence of the South-East (CCSE)	182	0.13	New	0	±0
Communist Unification of Spain (UCE)	166	0.12	New	0	±0
Renewed United Democratic Centre (CDUR)	139	0.10	New	0	±0
Centre and Democracy Forum (CyD)	134	0.10	New	0	±0
Blank ballots	3,127	2.29	+1.12		
Total	136,467			10	–1
Valid votes	136,467	98.38	–0.99		
Invalid votes	2,243	1.62	+0.99		
Votes cast / turnout	138,710	60.20	–0.76		
Abstentions		39.80	+0.76		
Registered voters					

=== 2007 ===
Summary of the 27 May 2007 Regional Assembly of Murcia election results in District Two
Parties and alliances	Popular vote			Seats	
Parties and alliances	Votes	%	±pp	Total	+/−
People's Party (PP)	77,446	57.42	–0.75	7	±0
Spanish Socialist Workers' Party (PSOE)	43,371	32.16	+0.19	4	+1
United Left–The Greens of the Region of Murcia (IU–LV–RM)^{1}	6,347	4.71	–2.60	0	±0
Regional Citizens' Coalition (CCR)	4,423	3.28	New	0	±0
Liberal Democratic Centre (CDL)	1,348	1.00	New	0	±0
National Democracy (DN)	354	0.26	+0.08	0	±0
Blank ballots	1,582	1.17	–0.31		
Total	134,871			11	+1
Valid votes	134,871	99.37	+0.26		
Invalid votes	851	0.63	–0.26		
Votes cast / turnout	135,722	60.96	–2.00		
Abstentions		39.04	+2.00		
Registered voters					
Sources
Footnotes: ^{1} United Left–The Greens of the Region of Murcia results are compared to the combined totals of United Left and The Greens in the 2003 election.

=== 2003 ===
Summary of the 25 May 2003 Regional Assembly of Murcia election results in District Two
Parties and alliances	Popular vote			Seats	
Parties and alliances	Votes	%	±pp	Total	+/−
People's Party (PP)	78,486	58.17	+3.59	7	+1
Spanish Socialist Workers' Party (PSOE)	43,132	31.97	–1.64	3	–1
United Left of the Region of Murcia (IURM)	7,130	5.28	–0.75	0	±0
The Greens (LV)	2,737	2.03	+0.75	0	±0
Citizens' Convergence of the South-East (CCSE)	804	0.60	–0.07	0	±0
Family and Life Party (PFyV)	392	0.29	New	0	±0
National Democracy–Workers' National Party (DN–PNT)^{1}	239	0.18	+0.05	0	±0
Blank ballots	2,002	1.48	+0.01		
Total	134,922			10	±0
Valid votes	134,922	99.11	–0.22		
Invalid votes	1,206	0.89	+0.22		
Votes cast / turnout	136,128	62.96	+3.37		
Abstentions		37.04	–3.37		
Registered voters					
Sources
Footnotes: ^{1} National Democracy–Workers' National Party results are compared to Workers' National Party totals in the 1999 election.

=== 1999 ===
Summary of the 13 June 1999 Regional Assembly of Murcia election results in District Two
Parties and alliances	Popular vote			Seats	
Parties and alliances	Votes	%	±pp	Total	+/−
People's Party (PP)	68,782	54.58	+2.70	6	±0
Spanish Socialist Workers' Party (PSOE)	42,353	33.61	+2.93	4	+1
United Left of the Region of Murcia (IURM)	7,601	6.03	–5.43	0	–1
The Greens (LV)	1,610	1.28	New	0	±0
Minor Sea Independent Party–Neighbourhood Indep. Movement (PIMM–MIV)	1,579	1.25	New	0	±0
Citizens' Convergence of the South-East (CCSE)	844	0.67	New	0	±0
Spanish Democratic Party (PADE)	562	0.45	New	0	±0
Centrist Union–Democratic and Social Centre (UC–CDS)	464	0.37	–1.00	0	±0
Union of the Peoples of Murcia (UPM)	196	0.16	New	0	±0
National Workers' Party (PNT)	168	0.13	New	0	±0
Blank ballots	1,855	1.47	+0.31		
Total	126,014			10	±0
Valid votes	126,014	99.33	+0.26		
Invalid votes	851	0.67	–0.26		
Votes cast / turnout	126,865	59.59	–9.24		
Abstentions		40.41	+9.24		
Registered voters					

=== 1995 ===
Summary of the 28 May 1995 Regional Assembly of Murcia election results in District Two
Parties and alliances	Popular vote			Seats	
Parties and alliances	Votes	%	±pp	Total	+/−
People's Party (PP)	69,975	51.88	+20.20	6	+2
Spanish Socialist Workers' Party (PSOE)	41,382	30.68	–11.97	3	–2
United Left–The Greens of the Region of Murcia (IU–LV–RM)^{1}	15,454	11.46	+0.42	1	±0
Cantonal Party (PCAN)	3,125	2.32	–3.83	0	±0
Centrist Union–Democratic and Social Centre (UC–CDS)	1,843	1.37	–5.74	0	±0
Democratic Bloc (BD)	808	0.60	New	0	±0
Regional Murcianist Party (PMR)	475	0.35	New	0	±0
New Region (NR)	268	0.20	New	0	±0
Blank ballots	1,559	1.16	+0.35		
Total	134,889			10	±0
Valid votes	134,889	99.07	+0.12		
Invalid votes	1,272	0.93	–0.12		
Votes cast / turnout	136,161	68.83	+10.78		
Abstentions		31.17	–10.78		
Registered voters					
Sources
Footnotes: ^{1} United Left–The Greens of the Region of Murcia results are compared to the combined totals of United Left and The Greens in the 1991 election.

=== 1991 ===
Summary of the 26 May 1991 Regional Assembly of Murcia election results in District Two
Parties and alliances	Popular vote			Seats	
Parties and alliances	Votes	%	±pp	Total	+/−
Spanish Socialist Workers' Party (PSOE)	44,760	42.65	+5.06	5	±0
People's Party (PP)^{1}	33,250	31.68	+4.06	4	±0
United Left (IU)	9,921	9.45	+4.16	1	+1
Democratic and Social Centre (CDS)	7,457	7.11	–5.25	0	–1
Regional Electoral Coalition (PCAN–PRM)^{2}	6,456	6.15	–9.05	0	±0
The Greens (LV)	1,667	1.59	New	0	±0
Rainbow (Arcoiris)	578	0.55	New	0	±0
Blank ballots	852	0.81	–0.17		
Total	104,941			10	±0
Valid votes	104,941	98.95	+0.25		
Invalid votes	1,113	1.05	–0.25		
Votes cast / turnout	106,054	58.05	–10.55		
Abstentions		41.95	+10.55		
Registered voters					
Sources
Footnotes: ^{1} People's Party results are compared to People's Alliance totals in the 1987 election.; ^{2} Regional Electoral Coalition results are compared to the combined totals of Cantonal Party and Murcian Regionalist Party in the 1987 election.

=== 1987 ===
Summary of the 10 June 1987 Regional Assembly of Murcia election results in District Two
Parties and alliances	Popular vote			Seats	
Parties and alliances	Votes	%	±pp	Total	+/−
Spanish Socialist Workers' Party (PSOE)	41,377	37.59	–11.82	5	–1
People's Alliance (AP)^{1}	30,408	27.62	–3.48	4	±0
Cantonal Party (PCAN)	16,428	14.92	+2.74	0	±0
Democratic and Social Centre (CDS)	13,601	12.36	+10.83	1	+1
United Left (IU)^{2}	5,818	5.29	±0.00	0	±0
Workers' Party of Spain–Communist Unity (PTE–UC)	713	0.65	New	0	±0
Humanist Platform (PH)	337	0.31	New	0	±0
Murcian Regionalist Party (PRM)	313	0.28	New	0	±0
Blank ballots	1,084	0.98	+0.49		
Total	110,079			10	±0
Valid votes	110,079	98.70	–0.20		
Invalid votes	1,445	1.30	+0.20		
Votes cast / turnout	111,524	68.60	+6.29		
Abstentions	51,048	31.40	–6.29		
Registered voters	162,572				
Sources
Footnotes: ^{1} People's Alliance results are compared to People's Coalition totals in the 1983 election.; ^{2} United Left results are compared to Communist Party of Spain totals in the 1983 election.

=== 1983 ===
Summary of the 8 May 1983 Regional Assembly of Murcia election results in District Two
Parties and alliances	Popular vote			Seats	
Parties and alliances	Votes	%	±pp	Total	+/−
Spanish Socialist Workers' Party (PSOE)	48,349	49.41	n/a	6	n/a
People's Coalition (AP–PDP–UL)	30,434	31.10	n/a	4	n/a
Cantonal Party (PCAN)	11,914	12.18	n/a	0	n/a
Communist Party of Spain (PCE)	5,174	5.29	n/a	0	n/a
Democratic and Social Centre (CDS)	1,500	1.53	n/a	0	n/a
Blank ballots	483	0.49	n/a		
Total	97,854			10	n/a
Valid votes	97,854	98.90	n/a		
Invalid votes	1,086	1.10	n/a		
Votes cast / turnout	98,940	62.31	n/a		
Abstentions	59,851	37.69	n/a		
Registered voters	158,791				
