= District Four (Regional Assembly of Murcia constituency) =

- Former Regional Assembly of Murcia; Electoral constituency
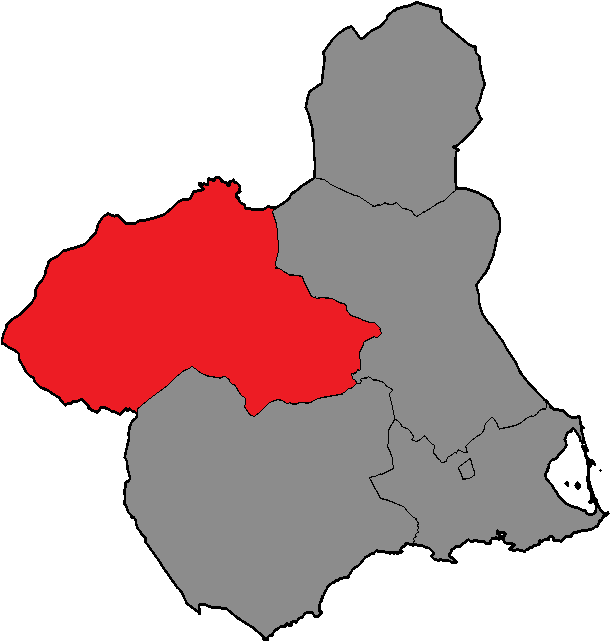
- Location of the District Four within the Region of Murcia
- Province: Murcia
- Autonomous community: Region of Murcia

Former constituency
- Created: 1983
- Abolished: 2015
- Seats: 4 (1983–1987); 5 (1987–1991); 4 (1991–2015)

District Four was one of the five constituencies (Spanish: circunscripciones) represented in the Regional Assembly of Murcia, the regional legislature of the Region of Murcia. The constituency last elected four deputies in 2015. It comprised the municipalities of Caravaca, Cehegín, Calasparra, Moratalla, Bullas, Pliego, Mula, Albudeite and Campos del Río. The electoral system used the D'Hondt method and a closed-list proportional representation, with a minimum threshold of five percent regionally.

== Electoral system ==
The constituency was created as per the Statute of Autonomy for the Region of Murcia of 1982 and was first contested in the 1983 regional election. The Statute provided for sub-provincial divisions of the Principality's territory to be established as multi-member districts in the Regional Assembly of Murcia, with this regulation being maintained under the 1986 regional electoral law. Each constituency was entitled to an initial minimum of one seat, with the remaining 40 being distributed in proportion to their populations. The exception was the 1983 election, when constituencies were allocated one fixed member and one additional member per each 25,000 inhabitants or fraction greater than 12,500.

Voting was on the basis of universal suffrage, which comprised all nationals over eighteen, registered in the Region of Murcia and in full enjoyment of their political rights. Amendments to the electoral law in 2011 required for Murcians abroad to apply for voting before being permitted to vote, a system known as "begged" or expat vote (Spanish: Voto rogado). Seats were elected using the D'Hondt method and a closed list proportional representation, with an electoral threshold of five percent of valid votes—which included blank ballots—being applied regionally. The use of the D'Hondt method might result in a higher effective threshold, depending on the district magnitude.

The electoral law allowed for parties and federations registered in the interior ministry, coalitions and groupings of electors to present lists of candidates. Parties and federations intending to form a coalition ahead of an election were required to inform the relevant Electoral Commission within ten days of the election call—fifteen before 1985—whereas groupings of electors needed to secure the signature of at least two percent of the electorate in the constituencies for which they sought election—one-thousandth of the electorate, with a compulsory minimum of 500 signatures, until 1985—disallowing electors from signing for more than one list of candidates.

A 2015 legal amendment saw the abolition of the five constituencies and their replacement by a single multi-member district comprising all the municipalities in the autonomous community. The electoral threshold was also lowered from five to three percent.

== Deputies ==
Deputies 1983–2015
Key to parties PSOE PP CP AP
Assembly	Election	Distribution
1st	1983	3 / 1
2nd	1987	4 / 1
3rd	1991	3 / 1
4th	1995	2 / 2
5th	1999	2 / 2
6th	2003	2 / 2
7th	2007	2 / 2
8th	2011	1 / 3
9th	2015	2 / 2

== Regional elections ==
=== 2015 ===
Summary of the 24 May 2015 Regional Assembly of Murcia election results in District Four
Parties and alliances	Popular vote			Seats	
Parties and alliances	Votes	%	±pp	Total	+/−
Spanish Socialist Workers' Party (PSOE)	19,758	38.86	+4.98	2	+1
People's Party (PP)	17,518	34.46	–18.70	2	–1
Citizens–Party of the Citizenry (C's)	4,787	9.42	New	0	±0
We Can (Podemos)	4,211	8.28	New	0	±0
Winning the Region of Murcia: Plural Left (IU–V–RM–CLI–AS)^{1}	2,699	5.31	–3.22	0	±0
Animalist Party Against Mistreatment of Animals (PACMA)	298	0.59	New	0	±0
Union, Progress and Democracy (UPyD)	245	0.48	–1.69	0	±0
Citizens of Democratic Centre (CCD)	243	0.48	New	0	±0
Vox (Vox)	131	0.26	New	0	±0
Blank Seats (EB)	74	0.15	New	0	±0
Zero Cuts (Recortes Cero)	58	0.11	New	0	±0
Centre and Democracy Forum (CyD)	37	0.07	+0.03	0	±0
Citizens' Democratic Renewal Movement (RED)	24	0.05	New	0	±0
Blank ballots	758	1.49	–0.13		
Total	50,841			4	±0
Valid votes	50,841	97.96	–0.69		
Invalid votes	1,057	2.04	+0.69		
Votes cast / turnout	51,898	70.18	–4.80		
Abstentions		29.82	+4.80		
Registered voters					
Sources
Footnotes: ^{1} Winning the Region of Murcia: Plural Left results are compared to United Left–Greens of the Region of Murcia totals in the 2011 election.

=== 2011 ===
Summary of the 22 May 2011 Regional Assembly of Murcia election results in District Four
Parties and alliances	Popular vote			Seats	
Parties and alliances	Votes	%	±pp	Total	+/−
People's Party (PP)	28,638	53.16	+2.57	3	+1
Spanish Socialist Workers' Party (PSOE)	18,253	33.88	–7.97	1	–1
United Left–Greens of the Region of Murcia (IU–V–RM)	4,268	7.92	+1.61	0	±0
Union, Progress and Democracy (UPyD)	1,169	2.17	New	0	±0
The Greens of the Region of Murcia–Ecolo (LV–Ecolo)	275	0.51	New	0	±0
Liberal Democratic Centre (CDL)	204	0.38	–0.39	0	±0
Renewed United Democratic Centre (CDUR)	50	0.09	New	0	±0
Employment Business Party (PEE)	42	0.08	New	0	±0
Party for the Regeneration of Democracy in Spain (PRDE)	34	0.06	New	0	±0
Communist Unification of Spain (UCE)	31	0.06	New	0	±0
Centre and Democracy Forum (CyD)	22	0.04	New	0	±0
State Reform of Nostradamus (REN)	19	0.04	New	0	±0
Blank ballots	871	1.62	+0.77		
Total	53,876			4	±0
Valid votes	53,876	98.65	–0.62		
Invalid votes	736	1.35	+0.62		
Votes cast / turnout	54,612	74.98	–2.04		
Abstentions		25.02	+2.04		
Registered voters					

=== 2007 ===
Summary of the 27 May 2007 Regional Assembly of Murcia election results in District Four
Parties and alliances	Popular vote			Seats	
Parties and alliances	Votes	%	±pp	Total	+/−
People's Party (PP)	27,621	50.59	–0.04	2	±0
Spanish Socialist Workers' Party (PSOE)	22,850	41.85	–0.30	2	±0
United Left–The Greens of the Region of Murcia (IU–LV–RM)^{1}	3,169	5.80	–0.28	0	±0
Liberal Democratic Centre (CDL)	420	0.77	New	0	±0
Regional Citizens' Coalition (CCR)	76	0.14	New	0	±0
Blank ballots	466	0.85	–0.09		
Total	54,602			4	±0
Valid votes	54,602	99.27	–0.01		
Invalid votes	400	0.73	+0.01		
Votes cast / turnout	55,002	77.02	–0.59		
Abstentions		22.98	+0.59		
Registered voters					
Sources
Footnotes: ^{1} United Left–The Greens of the Region of Murcia results are compared to the combined totals of United Left and The Greens in the 2003 election.

=== 2003 ===
Summary of the 25 May 2003 Regional Assembly of Murcia election results in District Four
Parties and alliances	Popular vote			Seats	
Parties and alliances	Votes	%	±pp	Total	+/−
People's Party (PP)	27,424	50.63	+3.73	2	±0
Spanish Socialist Workers' Party (PSOE)	22,828	42.15	–2.06	2	±0
United Left of the Region of Murcia (IURM)	3,037	5.61	–1.41	0	±0
The Greens (LV)	257	0.47	+0.13	0	±0
Democratic and Social Centre (CDS)	79	0.15	+0.01	0	±0
Citizens' Convergence of the South-East (CCSE)	32	0.06	New	0	±0
Blank ballots	507	0.94	+0.02		
Total	54,164			4	±0
Valid votes	54,164	99.28	–0.02		
Invalid votes	395	0.72	+0.02		
Votes cast / turnout	54,559	77.61	+1.31		
Abstentions		22.39	–1.31		
Registered voters					

=== 1999 ===
Summary of the 13 June 1999 Regional Assembly of Murcia election results in District Four
Parties and alliances	Popular vote			Seats	
Parties and alliances	Votes	%	±pp	Total	+/−
People's Party (PP)	24,892	46.90	+3.74	2	±0
Spanish Socialist Workers' Party (PSOE)	23,466	44.21	–0.18	2	±0
United Left of the Region of Murcia (IURM)	3,728	7.02	–3.48	0	±0
Spanish Democratic Party (PADE)	199	0.37	New	0	±0
The Greens (LV)	182	0.34	New	0	±0
Centrist Union–Democratic and Social Centre (UC–CDS)	73	0.14	–0.25	0	±0
Union of the Peoples of Murcia (UPM)	51	0.10	New	0	±0
Blank ballots	487	0.92	+0.05		
Total	53,078			4	±0
Valid votes	53,078	99.30	–0.03		
Invalid votes	374	0.70	+0.03		
Votes cast / turnout	53,452	76.30	–3.87		
Abstentions		23.70	+3.87		
Registered voters					

=== 1995 ===
Summary of the 28 May 1995 Regional Assembly of Murcia election results in District Four
Parties and alliances	Popular vote			Seats	
Parties and alliances	Votes	%	±pp	Total	+/−
Spanish Socialist Workers' Party (PSOE)	23,367	44.39	–10.96	2	–1
People's Party (PP)	22,719	43.16	+18.28	2	+1
United Left–The Greens of the Region of Murcia (IU–LV–RM)^{1}	5,528	10.50	+2.62	0	±0
Centrist Union–Democratic and Social Centre (UC–CDS)	204	0.39	–8.84	0	±0
Spanish Confederation of Independents (CEDI)	156	0.30	New	0	±0
Regional Murcianist Party (PMR)	112	0.21	New	0	±0
New Region (NR)	56	0.11	New	0	±0
Cantonal Party (PCAN)	39	0.07	–1.47	0	±0
Blank ballots	457	0.87	+0.20		
Total	52,638			4	±0
Valid votes	52,638	99.33	–0.01		
Invalid votes	357	0.67	+0.01		
Votes cast / turnout	52,995	80.17	+5.28		
Abstentions		19.83	–5.28		
Registered voters					
Sources
Footnotes: ^{1} United Left–The Greens of the Region of Murcia results are compared to the combined totals of United Left and The Greens in the 1991 election.

=== 1991 ===
Summary of the 26 May 1991 Regional Assembly of Murcia election results in District Four
Parties and alliances	Popular vote			Seats	
Parties and alliances	Votes	%	±pp	Total	+/−
Spanish Socialist Workers' Party (PSOE)	27,000	55.35	+0.84	3	–1
People's Party (PP)^{1}	12,136	24.88	–0.33	1	±0
Democratic and Social Centre (CDS)	4,505	9.23	–4.24	0	±0
United Left (IU)	3,629	7.44	+1.52	0	±0
Regional Electoral Coalition (PCAN–PRM)^{2}	751	1.54	+1.31	0	±0
The Greens (LV)	215	0.44	New	0	±0
The Greens Ecologist–Humanist List (LVLE–H)^{3}	120	0.25	+0.10	0	±0
Rainbow (Arcoiris)	100	0.20	New	0	±0
Blank ballots	328	0.67	+0.15		
Total	48,784			4	–1
Valid votes	48,784	99.34	–0.01		
Invalid votes	322	0.66	+0.01		
Votes cast / turnout	49,106	74.89	+0.07		
Abstentions		25.11	–0.07		
Registered voters					
Sources
Footnotes: ^{1} People's Party results are compared to People's Alliance totals in the 1987 election.; ^{2} Regional Electoral Coalition results are compared to the combined totals of Cantonal Party and Murcian Regionalist Party in the 1987 election.; ^{3} The Greens Ecologist–Humanist List results are compared to Humanist Platform totals in the 1987 election.

=== 1987 ===
Summary of the 10 June 1987 Regional Assembly of Murcia election results in District Four
Parties and alliances	Popular vote			Seats	
Parties and alliances	Votes	%	±pp	Total	+/−
Spanish Socialist Workers' Party (PSOE)	25,395	54.51	–3.35	4	+1
People's Alliance (AP)^{1}	11,745	25.21	–7.25	1	±0
Democratic and Social Centre (CDS)	6,277	13.47	New	0	±0
United Left (IU)^{2}	2,758	5.92	–0.82	0	±0
Humanist Platform (PH)	71	0.15	New	0	±0
Murcian Regionalist Party (PRM)	59	0.13	New	0	±0
Cantonal Party (PCAN)	46	0.10	–0.60	0	±0
Blank ballots	240	0.52	–0.26		
Total	46,591			5	+1
Valid votes	46,591	99.35	+0.40		
Invalid votes	305	0.65	–0.40		
Votes cast / turnout	46,896	74.82	+3.93		
Abstentions	15,786	25.18	–3.93		
Registered voters	62,682				
Sources
Footnotes: ^{1} People's Alliance results are compared to People's Coalition totals in the 1983 election.; ^{2} United Left results are compared to Communist Party of Spain totals in the 1983 election.

=== 1983 ===
Summary of the 8 May 1983 Regional Assembly of Murcia election results in District Four
Parties and alliances	Popular vote			Seats	
Parties and alliances	Votes	%	±pp	Total	+/−
Spanish Socialist Workers' Party (PSOE)	24,759	57.86	n/a	3	n/a
People's Coalition (AP–PDP–UL)	13,890	32.46	n/a	1	n/a
Communist Party of Spain (PCE)	2,884	6.74	n/a	0	n/a
Liberal Democratic Party (PDL)	623	1.46	n/a	0	n/a
Cantonal Party (PCAN)	300	0.70	n/a	0	n/a
Blank ballots	334	0.78	n/a		
Total	42,790			4	n/a
Valid votes	42,790	98.95	n/a		
Invalid votes	455	1.05	n/a		
Votes cast / turnout	43,245	70.89	n/a		
Abstentions	17,762	29.11	n/a		
Registered voters	61,007				
