= District Five (Regional Assembly of Murcia constituency) =

- Former Regional Assembly of Murcia; Electoral constituency
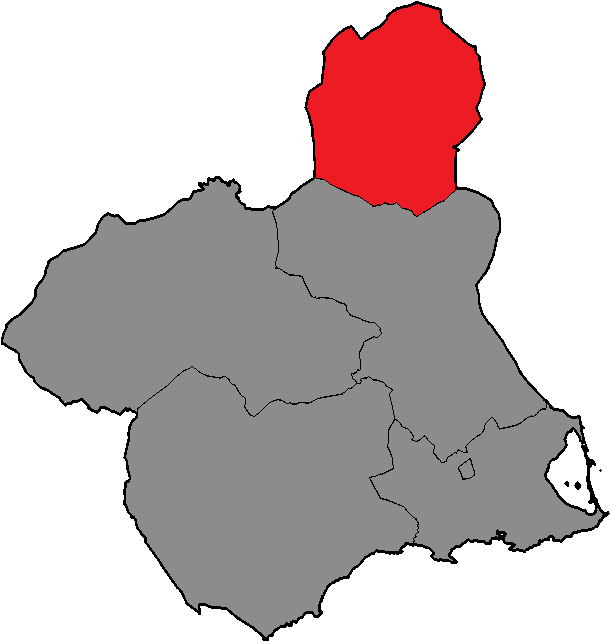
- Location of the District Five within the Region of Murcia
- Province: Murcia
- Autonomous community: Region of Murcia

Former constituency
- Created: 1983
- Abolished: 2015
- Seats: 3 (1983–2015); 2 (2015–2019)

District Five was one of the five constituencies (Spanish: circunscripciones) represented in the Regional Assembly of Murcia, the regional legislature of the Region of Murcia. The constituency last elected two deputies in 2015. It comprised the municipalities of Yecla and Jumilla. The electoral system used the D'Hondt method and a closed-list proportional representation, with a minimum threshold of five percent regionally.

== Electoral system ==
The constituency was created as per the Statute of Autonomy for the Region of Murcia of 1982 and was first contested in the 1983 regional election. The Statute provided for sub-provincial divisions of the Principality's territory to be established as multi-member districts in the Regional Assembly of Murcia, with this regulation being maintained under the 1986 regional electoral law. Each constituency was entitled to an initial minimum of one seat, with the remaining 40 being distributed in proportion to their populations. The exception was the 1983 election, when constituencies were allocated one fixed member and one additional member per each 25,000 inhabitants or fraction greater than 12,500.

Voting was on the basis of universal suffrage, which comprised all nationals over eighteen, registered in the Region of Murcia and in full enjoyment of their political rights. Amendments to the electoral law in 2011 required for Murcians abroad to apply for voting before being permitted to vote, a system known as "begged" or expat vote (Spanish: Voto rogado). Seats were elected using the D'Hondt method and a closed list proportional representation, with an electoral threshold of five percent of valid votes—which included blank ballots—being applied regionally. The use of the D'Hondt method might result in a higher effective threshold, depending on the district magnitude.

The electoral law allowed for parties and federations registered in the interior ministry, coalitions and groupings of electors to present lists of candidates. Parties and federations intending to form a coalition ahead of an election were required to inform the relevant Electoral Commission within ten days of the election call—fifteen before 1985—whereas groupings of electors needed to secure the signature of at least two percent of the electorate in the constituencies for which they sought election—one-thousandth of the electorate, with a compulsory minimum of 500 signatures, until 1985—disallowing electors from signing for more than one list of candidates.

A 2015 legal amendment saw the abolition of the five constituencies and their replacement by a single multi-member district comprising all the municipalities in the autonomous community. The electoral threshold was also lowered from five to three percent.

== Deputies ==
Deputies 1983–2015
Key to parties PSOE PP CP AP
| Assembly | Election | Distribution |
| 1st | 1983 | 2 / 1 |
| 2nd | 1987 | 2 / 1 |
| 3rd | 1991 | 2 / 1 |
| 4th | 1995 | 1 / 2 |
| 5th | 1999 | 1 / 2 |
| 6th | 2003 | 1 / 2 |
| 7th | 2007 | 1 / 2 |
| 8th | 2011 | 1 / 2 |
| 9th | 2015 | 1 / 1 |

== Regional elections ==
=== 2015 ===
Summary of the 24 May 2015 Regional Assembly of Murcia election results in District Five
| Parties and alliances | Popular vote | | | Seats | |
| Parties and alliances | Votes | % | ±pp | Total | +/− |
|---|---|---|---|---|---|
| People's Party (PP) | 11,395 | 41.72 | –10.59 | 1 | –1 |
| Spanish Socialist Workers' Party (PSOE) | 7,140 | 26.14 | –2.88 | 1 | ±0 |
| Citizens–Party of the Citizenry (C's) | 2,654 | 9.72 | New | 0 | ±0 |
| We Can (Podemos) | 2,359 | 8.64 | New | 0 | ±0 |
| Winning the Region of Murcia: Plural Left (IU–V–RM–CLI–AS)^{1} | 2,252 | 8.25 | –1.90 | 0 | ±0 |
| Union, Progress and Democracy (UPyD) | 258 | 0.94 | –2.06 | 0 | ±0 |
| Animalist Party Against Mistreatment of Animals (PACMA) | 237 | 0.87 | New | 0 | ±0 |
| Citizens of Democratic Centre (CCD) | 159 | 0.58 | New | 0 | ±0 |
| Vox (Vox) | 83 | 0.30 | New | 0 | ±0 |
| Blank Seats (EB) | 47 | 0.17 | New | 0 | ±0 |
| Zero Cuts (Recortes Cero) | 30 | 0.11 | New | 0 | ±0 |
| Centre and Democracy Forum (CyD) | 18 | 0.07 | +0.01 | 0 | ±0 |
| Citizens' Democratic Renewal Movement (RED) | 16 | 0.06 | New | 0 | ±0 |
| Spain on the Move (LEM) | 14 | 0.05 | New | 0 | ±0 |
| Blank ballots | 651 | 2.38 | –1.05 | | |
| Total | 27,313 | | | 2 | –1 |
| Valid votes | 27,313 | 96.82 | –1.03 | | |
| Invalid votes | 897 | 3.18 | +1.03 | | |
| Votes cast / turnout | 28,210 | 66.05 | –4.90 | | |
| Abstentions | | 33.95 | +4.90 | | |
| Registered voters | | | | | |
Sources
Footnotes: ^{1} Winning the Region of Murcia: Plural Left results are compared to United Left–Greens of the Region of Murcia totals in the 2011 election.

=== 2011 ===
Summary of the 22 May 2011 Regional Assembly of Murcia election results in District Five
| Parties and alliances | Popular vote | | | Seats | |
| Parties and alliances | Votes | % | ±pp | Total | +/− |
|---|---|---|---|---|---|
| People's Party (PP) | 14,966 | 52.31 | +3.28 | 2 | ±0 |
| Spanish Socialist Workers' Party (PSOE) | 8,303 | 29.02 | –5.53 | 1 | ±0 |
| United Left–Greens of the Region of Murcia (IU–V–RM) | 2,904 | 10.15 | –0.55 | 0 | ±0 |
| Union, Progress and Democracy (UPyD) | 859 | 3.00 | New | 0 | ±0 |
| Republican Platform–Republican Coalition of the Region of Murcia (PRCR) | 220 | 0.77 | New | 0 | ±0 |
| Liberal Democratic Centre (CDL) | 161 | 0.56 | +0.39 | 0 | ±0 |
| The Phalanx (FE) | 71 | 0.25 | New | 0 | ±0 |
| Communist Unification of Spain (UCE) | 64 | 0.22 | New | 0 | ±0 |
| Party for the Regeneration of Democracy in Spain (PRDE) | 36 | 0.13 | New | 0 | ±0 |
| The Greens of the Region of Murcia–Ecolo (LV–Ecolo) | 22 | 0.08 | New | 0 | ±0 |
| Centre and Democracy Forum (CyD) | 17 | 0.06 | New | 0 | ±0 |
| State Reform of Nostradamus (REN) | 6 | 0.02 | New | 0 | ±0 |
| Blank ballots | 980 | 3.43 | +0.99 | | |
| Total | 28,609 | | | 3 | ±0 |
| Valid votes | 28,609 | 97.85 | –1.08 | | |
| Invalid votes | 630 | 2.15 | +1.08 | | |
| Votes cast / turnout | 29,239 | 70.95 | –0.74 | | |
| Abstentions | | 29.05 | +0.74 | | |
| Registered voters | | | | | |

=== 2007 ===
Summary of the 27 May 2007 Regional Assembly of Murcia election results in District Five
| Parties and alliances | Popular vote | | | Seats | |
| Parties and alliances | Votes | % | ±pp | Total | +/− |
|---|---|---|---|---|---|
| People's Party (PP) | 13,888 | 49.03 | –0.99 | 2 | ±0 |
| Spanish Socialist Workers' Party (PSOE) | 9,786 | 34.55 | –0.42 | 1 | ±0 |
| United Left–The Greens of the Region of Murcia (IU–LV–RM)^{1} | 3,030 | 10.70 | –1.15 | 0 | ±0 |
| Regional Citizens' Coalition (CCR) | 752 | 2.66 | New | 0 | ±0 |
| National Democracy (DN) | 129 | 0.46 | New | 0 | ±0 |
| Liberal Democratic Centre (CDL) | 48 | 0.17 | New | 0 | ±0 |
| Blank ballots | 690 | 2.44 | –0.36 | | |
| Total | 28,323 | | | 3 | ±0 |
| Valid votes | 28,323 | 98.93 | +0.15 | | |
| Invalid votes | 305 | 1.07 | –0.15 | | |
| Votes cast / turnout | 28,628 | 71.69 | –2.57 | | |
| Abstentions | | 28.31 | +2.57 | | |
| Registered voters | | | | | |
Sources
Footnotes: ^{1} United Left–The Greens of the Region of Murcia results are compared to the combined totals of United Left and The Greens in the 2003 election.

=== 2003 ===
Summary of the 25 May 2003 Regional Assembly of Murcia election results in District Five
| Parties and alliances | Popular vote | | | Seats | |
| Parties and alliances | Votes | % | ±pp | Total | +/− |
|---|---|---|---|---|---|
| People's Party (PP) | 14,427 | 50.02 | +0.11 | 2 | ±0 |
| Spanish Socialist Workers' Party (PSOE) | 10,086 | 34.97 | +1.18 | 1 | ±0 |
| United Left of the Region of Murcia (IURM) | 3,052 | 10.58 | –2.69 | 0 | ±0 |
| The Greens (LV) | 365 | 1.27 | +0.61 | 0 | ±0 |
| Democratic and Social Centre (CDS) | 57 | 0.20 | +0.03 | 0 | ±0 |
| Citizens' Convergence of the South-East (CCSE) | 47 | 0.16 | New | 0 | ±0 |
| Blank ballots | 808 | 2.80 | +0.81 | | |
| Total | 28,842 | | | 3 | ±0 |
| Valid votes | 28,842 | 98.78 | –0.24 | | |
| Invalid votes | 356 | 1.22 | +0.24 | | |
| Votes cast / turnout | 29,198 | 74.26 | +2.37 | | |
| Abstentions | | 25.74 | –2.37 | | |
| Registered voters | | | | | |

=== 1999 ===
Summary of the 13 June 1999 Regional Assembly of Murcia election results in District Five
| Parties and alliances | Popular vote | | | Seats | |
| Parties and alliances | Votes | % | ±pp | Total | +/− |
|---|---|---|---|---|---|
| People's Party (PP) | 13,811 | 49.91 | +1.93 | 2 | ±0 |
| Spanish Socialist Workers' Party (PSOE) | 9,349 | 33.79 | +1.70 | 1 | ±0 |
| United Left of the Region of Murcia (IURM) | 3,672 | 13.27 | –4.69 | 0 | ±0 |
| The Greens (LV) | 183 | 0.66 | New | 0 | ±0 |
| Centrist Union–Democratic and Social Centre (UC–CDS) | 47 | 0.17 | –0.08 | 0 | ±0 |
| Union of the Peoples of Murcia (UPM) | 31 | 0.11 | New | 0 | ±0 |
| Spanish Democratic Party (PADE) | 28 | 0.10 | New | 0 | ±0 |
| Blank ballots | 550 | 1.99 | +0.65 | | |
| Total | 27,671 | | | 3 | ±0 |
| Valid votes | 27,671 | 99.02 | –0.07 | | |
| Invalid votes | 275 | 0.98 | +0.07 | | |
| Votes cast / turnout | 27,946 | 71.89 | –6.52 | | |
| Abstentions | | 28.11 | +6.52 | | |
| Registered voters | | | | | |

=== 1995 ===
Summary of the 28 May 1995 Regional Assembly of Murcia election results in District Five
| Parties and alliances | Popular vote | | | Seats | |
| Parties and alliances | Votes | % | ±pp | Total | +/− |
|---|---|---|---|---|---|
| People's Party (PP) | 13,510 | 47.98 | +13.14 | 2 | +1 |
| Spanish Socialist Workers' Party (PSOE) | 9,037 | 32.09 | –9.94 | 1 | –1 |
| United Left–The Greens of the Region of Murcia (IU–LV–RM)^{1} | 5,057 | 17.96 | +3.08 | 0 | ±0 |
| Centrist Union–Democratic and Social Centre (UC–CDS) | 69 | 0.25 | –5.45 | 0 | ±0 |
| Democratic Bloc (BD) | 38 | 0.13 | New | 0 | ±0 |
| Cantonal Party (PCAN) | 26 | 0.09 | –0.83 | 0 | ±0 |
| Regional Murcianist Party (PMR) | 26 | 0.09 | New | 0 | ±0 |
| New Region (NR) | 19 | 0.07 | New | 0 | ±0 |
| Blank ballots | 378 | 1.34 | +0.43 | | |
| Total | 28,160 | | | 3 | ±0 |
| Valid votes | 28,160 | 99.09 | –0.06 | | |
| Invalid votes | 260 | 0.91 | +0.06 | | |
| Votes cast / turnout | 28,420 | 78.41 | +4.71 | | |
| Abstentions | | 21.59 | –4.71 | | |
| Registered voters | | | | | |
Sources
Footnotes: ^{1} United Left–The Greens of the Region of Murcia results are compared to the combined totals of United Left and The Greens in the 1991 election.

=== 1991 ===
Summary of the 26 May 1991 Regional Assembly of Murcia election results in District Five
| Parties and alliances | Popular vote | | | Seats | |
| Parties and alliances | Votes | % | ±pp | Total | +/− |
|---|---|---|---|---|---|
| Spanish Socialist Workers' Party (PSOE) | 10,597 | 42.03 | –0.61 | 2 | ±0 |
| People's Party (PP)^{1} | 8,782 | 34.84 | +2.12 | 1 | ±0 |
| United Left (IU) | 3,642 | 14.45 | +0.86 | 0 | ±0 |
| Democratic and Social Centre (CDS) | 1,436 | 5.70 | –3.43 | 0 | ±0 |
| Regional Electoral Coalition (PCAN–PRM)^{2} | 232 | 0.92 | +0.69 | 0 | ±0 |
| The Greens (LV) | 108 | 0.43 | New | 0 | ±0 |
| The Greens Ecologist–Humanist List (LVLE–H)^{3} | 99 | 0.39 | +0.23 | 0 | ±0 |
| Rainbow (Arcoiris) | 84 | 0.33 | New | 0 | ±0 |
| Blank ballots | 230 | 0.91 | –0.23 | | |
| Total | 25,210 | | | 3 | ±0 |
| Valid votes | 25,210 | 99.15 | +0.29 | | |
| Invalid votes | 215 | 0.85 | –0.29 | | |
| Votes cast / turnout | 25,425 | 73.70 | –4.78 | | |
| Abstentions | | 26.39 | +4.78 | | |
| Registered voters | | | | | |
Sources
Footnotes: ^{1} People's Party results are compared to People's Alliance totals in the 1987 election.; ^{2} Regional Electoral Coalition results are compared to the combined totals of Cantonal Party and Murcian Regionalist Party in the 1987 election.; ^{3} The Greens Ecologist–Humanist List results are compared to Humanist Platform totals in the 1987 election.

=== 1987 ===
Summary of the 10 June 1987 Regional Assembly of Murcia election results in District Five
| Parties and alliances | Popular vote | | | Seats | |
| Parties and alliances | Votes | % | ±pp | Total | +/− |
|---|---|---|---|---|---|
| Spanish Socialist Workers' Party (PSOE) | 10,683 | 42.64 | –4.02 | 2 | ±0 |
| People's Alliance (AP)^{1} | 8,199 | 32.72 | –5.88 | 1 | ±0 |
| United Left (IU)^{2} | 3,405 | 13.59 | –0.43 | 0 | ±0 |
| Democratic and Social Centre (CDS) | 2,288 | 9.13 | New | 0 | ±0 |
| Workers' Party of Spain–Communist Unity (PTE–UC) | 98 | 0.39 | New | 0 | ±0 |
| Humanist Platform (PH) | 39 | 0.16 | New | 0 | ±0 |
| Murcian Regionalist Party (PRM) | 38 | 0.15 | New | 0 | ±0 |
| Cantonal Party (PCAN) | 20 | 0.08 | –0.09 | 0 | ±0 |
| Blank ballots | 286 | 1.14 | +0.58 | | |
| Total | 25,056 | | | 3 | ±0 |
| Valid votes | 25,056 | 98.86 | –0.40 | | |
| Invalid votes | 289 | 1.14 | +0.40 | | |
| Votes cast / turnout | 25,345 | 78.48 | –1.03 | | |
| Abstentions | 6,949 | 21.52 | +1.03 | | |
| Registered voters | 32,294 | | | | |
Sources
Footnotes: ^{1} People's Alliance results are compared to People's Coalition totals in the 1983 election.; ^{2} United Left results are compared to Communist Party of Spain totals in the 1983 election.

=== 1983 ===
Summary of the 8 May 1983 Regional Assembly of Murcia election results in District Five
| Parties and alliances | Popular vote | | | Seats | |
| Parties and alliances | Votes | % | ±pp | Total | +/− |
|---|---|---|---|---|---|
| Spanish Socialist Workers' Party (PSOE) | 11,849 | 46.66 | n/a | 2 | n/a |
| People's Coalition (AP–PDP–UL) | 9,802 | 38.60 | n/a | 1 | n/a |
| Communist Party of Spain (PCE) | 3,560 | 14.02 | n/a | 0 | n/a |
| Cantonal Party (PCAN) | 42 | 0.17 | n/a | 0 | n/a |
| Blank ballots | 142 | 0.56 | n/a | | |
| Total | 25,395 | | | 3 | n/a |
| Valid votes | 25,395 | 99.26 | n/a | | |
| Invalid votes | 189 | 0.74 | n/a | | |
| Votes cast / turnout | 25,584 | 79.51 | n/a | | |
| Abstentions | 6,592 | 20.49 | n/a | | |
| Registered voters | 32,176 | | | | |
