= Rafael González Tovar =

Spanish politician

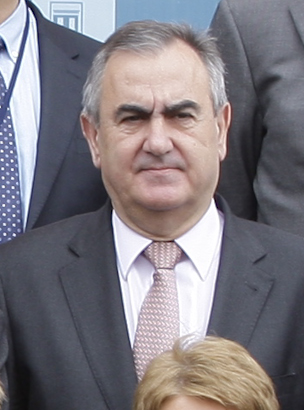

Rafael González Tovar (born 27 August 1953) is a Spanish doctor and politician of the Spanish Socialist Workers' Party (PSOE). He was a councillor in Blanca (1987–1991) and Murcia (2003–2007), and a deputy in the Regional Assembly of Murcia (1999–2003; 2015–2019), as well as government delegate to the Region of Murcia from 2008 to 2011. Elected secretary general of the Murcian PSOE in 2012, he led the party to second place in the 2015 Murcian regional election, and did not run for re-election in 2017.

== Biography ==
González Tovar was born in Alquerías (Murcia), a village belonging to the city of Murcia. He graduated in medicine and surgery from the University of Murcia. His daughter María González Veracruz (born 1979) is also a politician of the Spanish Socialist Workers' Party (PSOE) at regional and national level; her first son was named after him in 2014.

González Tovar was a town councillor in Blanca from 1987 to 1991. He was then named cabinet director at the Ministry of Health in the Council of Government of the Region of Murcia from November 1991 to May 1993, then director general of the Ministry of Health and Consumer Affairs until June 1995. In the 1999 Murcian regional election, he was elected to the Regional Assembly of Murcia. Four years later, he was voted onto the city council, with the PSOE in opposition.

Having left politics and returned to medicine before the 2007 local elections, González Tovar returned to office in May 2008 as the government delegate to the Region of Murcia. He pledged to work alongside the regional government, of the People's Party (PP). At the end of 2011, he gave up the role to return to his profession again.

González Tovar was elected leader of the Socialist Party of the Region of Murcia (PSRM) in March 2012 with 117 out of 310 votes, ahead of Beniel mayor Roberto García's 112 and regional deputy Joaquín López's 76. In the 2015 Spanish local elections, his party made gains and the PP losses. Despite a similar trend in the regional election in which González Tovar was candidate for President of the Region of Murcia, the PP retained office with their candidate Pedro Antonio Sánchez achieving a majority with the 22 deputies from his party and four from Citizens.

In May 2017, González Tovar said that he would not run for re-election as secretary general; he said that there were too many factions in the party for it to take advantage of what he considered to be the PP's unpopularity. He stated that he would not run in the 2019 Murcian regional election, where his party would be led by his successor Diego Conesa, and returned to medicine once more.
