= Javier Sánchez Serna =

Spanish politician

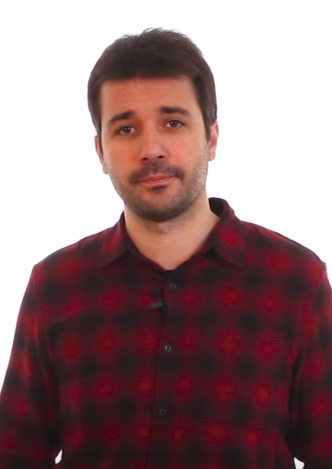
- Javier Sánchez 2018

Third Secretary of the Congress of Deputies
- In office 3 December 2019 – 17 August 2023
- Monarch: Felipe VI
- President: Meritxell Batet
- Preceded by: Adolfo Suárez Illana
- Succeeded by: Guillermo Mariscal Anaya

Member of the Congress of Deputies
- Incumbent
- Assumed office 4 January 2016
- Constituency: Murcia

Regional Coordinator of Podemos Region of Murcia
- Incumbent
- Assumed office 20 June 2020
- Preceded by: Óscar Urralburu

Personal details
- Born: 23 July 1985 (age 41)
- Party: Podemos

Javier Sánchez Serna (Murcia, 23 July 1985) is a Spanish politician, who has served as a deputy for Murcia in the Congress during the 11th, 12th, 13th, 14th, and 15th legislatures. He was the Third Secretary of the Congress of Deputies and is currently the Regional Coordinator of Podemos Region of Murcia.

== Biography ==
Sánchez Serna holds a degree in Philosophy and a master's degree in Applied Sociology. He has worked as a substitute teacher in Secondary Education specializing in Philosophy. From the age of 18, he has been involved in various political and social movements related to youth, housing, and the student struggle against the so-called "Bologna Process". For two years, he coordinated the research group "Postmodernity, Crisis, and the Commons" at the Center for Advanced Studies in Contemporary Art in Murcia. He is the Regional Coordinator of Podemos Region of Murcia and a member of the State Citizens Council of Podemos.

In the 2015 Spanish general election, Sánchez Serna was elected as a deputy for Murcia in the Congress, and was re-elected in 2016, where he served as the spokesperson for the Education and Sports Committee, the Science Committee, and as deputy spokesperson for the Universities Committee until the end of the 13th legislature.

In 2019, he once again led the Unidas Podemos list for the Congress of Deputies in Murcia, retaining his seat in both the April 2019 Spanish general election and the November 2019 Spanish general election. Since September of that year, he has also led the Podemos Region of Murcia's interim executive after the previous leadership stepped down, becoming the Regional Coordinator of the party following internal primaries.

On 3 December 2019, Sánchez Serna was elected as the Third Secretary of the Congress of Deputies and serves as the spokesperson for the Education and Vocational Training Committee, as well as the Science, Innovation, and Universities Committee.

Following the 2023 Spanish general election, he was elected as a deputy for the 15th Cortes Generales as the head of the Sumar list for Murcia, and later joined the Mixed Parliamentary Group along with other Podemos deputies.
