= 2015 Murcian regional election =

Election in the Spanish region of Murcia

- 24 May 2015

All 45 seats in the Regional Assembly of Murcia 23 seats needed for a majority
- Opinion polls
- Registered: 1,027,213 ▲5.4%
- Turnout: 652,979 (63.6%) ▼4.3 pp
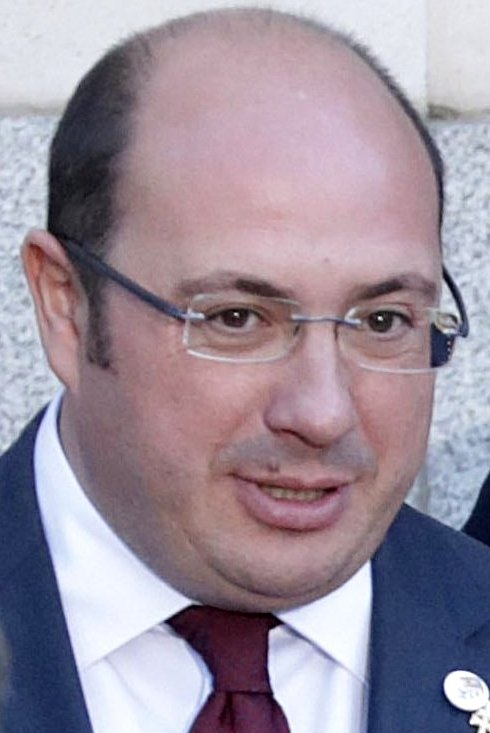

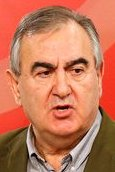

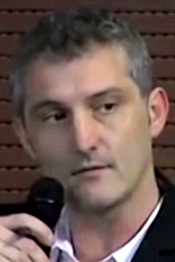

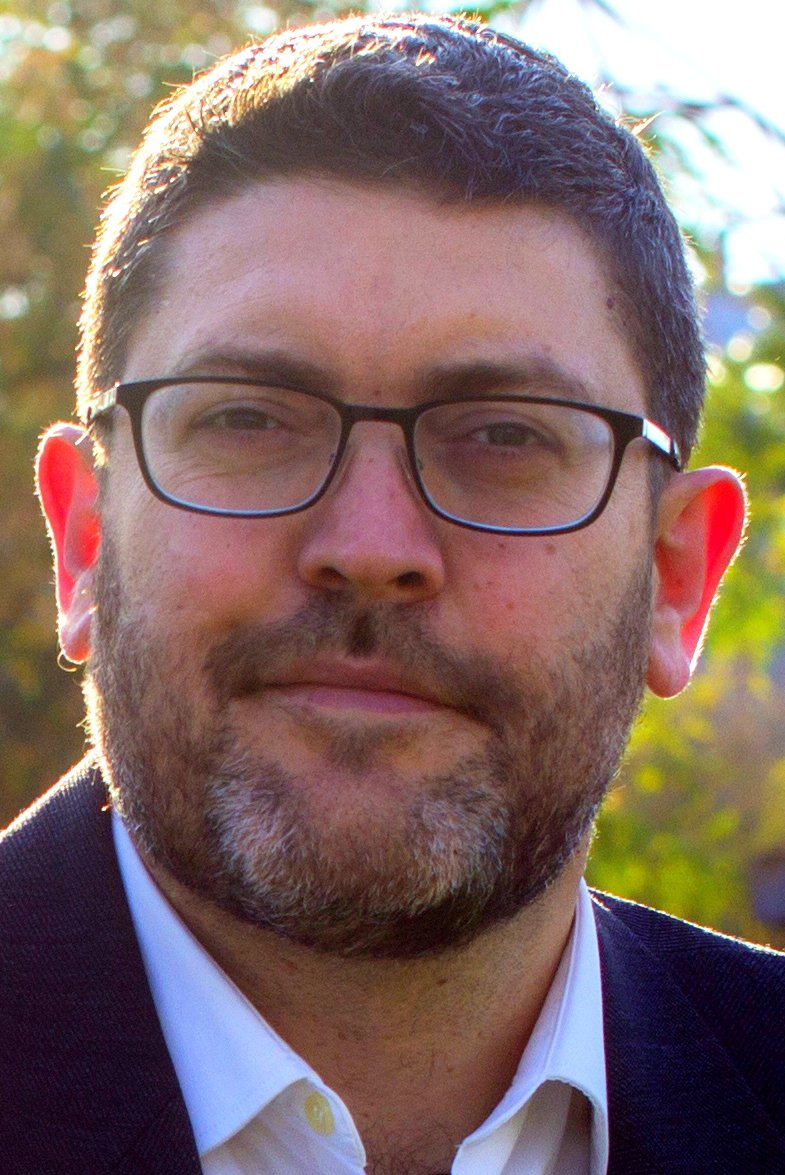

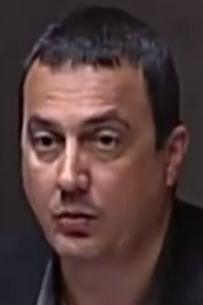
	First party	Second party	Third party
Leader	Pedro Antonio Sánchez	Rafael González Tovar	Óscar Urralburu
Party	PP	PSOE	Podemos
Leader since	5 March 2015	23 March 2012	1 April 2015
Leader's seat	Three	Three	Three
Last election	33 seats, 58.8%	11 seats, 23.9%	Did not contest
Seats won	22	13	6
Seat change	▼11	▲2	▲6
Popular vote	239,011	153,231	84,577
Percentage	37.4%	23.9%	13.2%
Swing	▼21.4 pp	0.0 pp	New party
	Fourth party	Fifth party
Leader	Miguel Sánchez	José Antonio Pujante
Party	C's	Ganar la Región de Murcia
Leader since	16 March 2015	April 2005
Leader's seat	Three	Three
Last election	Did not contest	1 seat, 7.8% (Note: Results for IU–V–RM in the 2011 election.)
Seats won	4	0
Seat change	▲4	▼1
Popular vote	80,459	30,761
Percentage	12.6%	4.8%
Swing	New party	▼3.0 pp
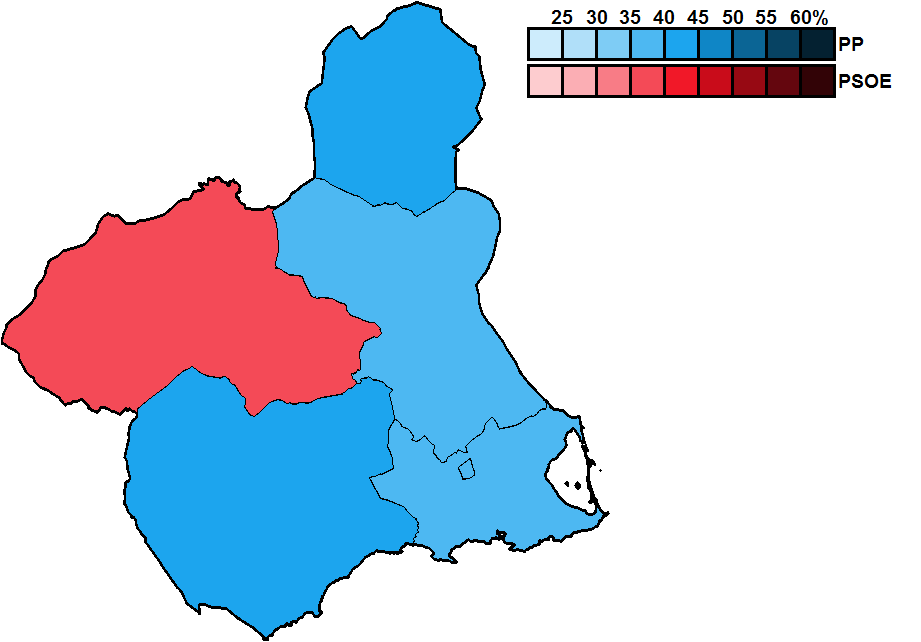
- Constituency results map for the Regional Assembly of Murcia
President before election
Alberto Garre
PP
Elected President
Pedro Antonio Sánchez
PP

A regional election was held in the Region of Murcia on 24 May 2015 to elect the 9th Regional Assembly of the autonomous community. All 45 seats in the Regional Assembly were up for election. It was held concurrently with regional elections in twelve other autonomous communities and local elections all across Spain.

== Overview ==
=== Electoral system ===
The Regional Assembly of Murcia was the devolved, unicameral legislature of the autonomous community of Murcia, having legislative power in regional matters as defined by the Spanish Constitution and the Murcian Statute of Autonomy, as well as the ability to vote confidence in or withdraw it from a regional president.

Voting for the Regional Assembly was on the basis of universal suffrage, which comprised all nationals over 18 years of age, registered in the Region of Murcia and in full enjoyment of their political rights. Additionally, Murcians abroad were required to apply for voting before being permitted to vote, a system known as "begged" or expat vote (Spanish: Voto rogado). The 45 members of the Regional Assembly of Murcia were elected using the D'Hondt method and a closed list proportional representation, with an electoral threshold of five percent of valid votes—which included blank ballots—being applied regionally. Seats were allocated to constituencies, which were established by law as follows:

- District One (comprising the municipalities of Lorca, Aguilas, Puerto Lumbreras, Totana, Alhama de Murcia, Librilla, Aledo and Mazarrón).
- District Two (comprising the municipalities of Cartagena, La Unión, Fuente Alamo de Murcia, Torre-Pacheco, San Javier, San Pedro del Pinatar and Los Alcázares).
- District Three (comprising the municipalities of Murcia, Alcantarilla, Beniel, Molina de Segura, Alguazas, Las Torres de Cotillas, Lorquí, Ceutí, Cieza, Abarán, Blanca, Archena, Ricote, Ulea, Villanueva del Río Segura, Ojós, Fortuna, Abanilla and Santomera).
- District Four (comprising the municipalities of Caravaca, Cehegín, Calasparra, Moratalla, Bullas, Pliego, Mula, Albudeite and Campos del Río).
- District Five (comprising the municipalities of Yecla and Jumilla).

Each constituency was entitled to an initial minimum of one seat, with the remaining 40 allocated among the constituencies in proportion to their populations.

=== Election date ===
The term of the Regional Assembly of Murcia expired four years after the date of its previous election. Elections to the Regional Assembly were fixed for the fourth Sunday of May every four years. The previous election was held on 22 May 2011, setting the election date for the Regional Assembly on 24 May 2015.

The president had the prerogative to dissolve the Regional Assembly of Murcia and call a snap election, provided that no motion of no confidence was in process, no nationwide election was due and some time requirements were met: namely, that dissolution did not occur either during the first legislative session or within the legislature's last year ahead of its scheduled expiry, nor before one year had elapsed since a previous dissolution under this procedure. In the event of an investiture process failing to elect a regional president within a two-month period from the first ballot, the Regional Assembly was to be automatically dissolved and a fresh election called. Any snap election held as a result of these circumstances would not alter the period to the next ordinary election, with elected lawmakers serving the remainder of its original four-year term.

== Parties and candidates ==
The electoral law allowed for parties and federations registered in the interior ministry, coalitions and groupings of electors to present lists of candidates. Parties and federations intending to form a coalition ahead of an election were required to inform the relevant Electoral Commission within ten days of the election call, whereas groupings of electors needed to secure the signature of at least one percent of the electorate in the Region of Murcia, disallowing electors from signing for more than one list of candidates.

Below is a list of the main parties and electoral alliances which contested the election:

Candidacy	Parties and alliances	Leading candidate	Ideology	Previous result		Gov.	Ref.
Candidacy	Parties and alliances	Leading candidate	Ideology	Vote %	Seats	Gov.	Ref.
PP	List: People's Party (PP)	Pedro Antonio Sánchez	Conservatism; Christian democracy	58.8%	33	Yes	
PSOE	List: Spanish Socialist Workers' Party (PSOE)	Rafael González Tovar	Social democracy	23.9%	11	No	
Ganar.IP	List: United Left–Greens of the Region of Murcia (IU–V–RM) – Communist Party of the Region of Murcia (PCM) – Ecosocialists of the Region of Murcia (ESRM) – The Dawn Marxist Organization (La Aurora (OM)) – Republican Left (IR) – Open Left (IzAb); Building the Left–Socialist Alternative (CLI–AS)	José Antonio Pujante	Socialism; Communism; Eco-socialism	7.8%	1	No	
Podemos	List: We Can (Podemos)	Óscar Urralburu	Left-wing populism Direct democracy Democratic socialism	—N/a		No	
C's	List: Citizens–Party of the Citizenry (C's)	Miguel Sánchez	Liberalism	—N/a		No	

== Opinion polls ==
The table below lists voting intention estimates in reverse chronological order, showing the most recent first and using the dates when the survey fieldwork was done, as opposed to the date of publication. Where the fieldwork dates are unknown, the date of publication is given instead. The highest percentage figure in each polling survey is displayed with its background shaded in the leading party's colour. If a tie ensues, this is applied to the figures with the highest percentages. The "Lead" column on the right shows the percentage-point difference between the parties with the highest percentages in a poll. When available, seat projections determined by the polling organisations are displayed below (or in place of) the percentages in a smaller font; 23 seats were required for an absolute majority in the Regional Assembly of Murcia.

Color key:

Poll conducted after legal ban on opinion polls

Polling firm/Commissioner	Fieldwork date	Sample size	Turnout	PP	PSOE	Ganar.IP	UPyD	Podemos	C's	Lead
2015 regional election	24 May 2015	—N/a	63.6	37.4; 22	23.9; 13	4.8; 0	1.6; 0	13.2; 6	12.6; 4	13.5
GAD3/Antena 3	11–22 May 2015	?	?	? 21/23	? 12/13	–	–	? 4/6	? 5/6	?
GAD3/ABC	17 May 2015	?	?	? 22	? 12/13	–	–	? 4/5	? 6	?
NC Report/La Razón	17 May 2015	400	?	40.2; 20/21	21.6; 11/12	4.8; 0	1.8; 0	12.3; 6/7	14.2; 7/8	18.6
CEMOP	4–10 May 2015	800	68.4	35.2; 18/20	21.3; 11	5.2; 0	1.1; 0	13.8; 5	21.8; 9/11	13.4
CIS	23 Mar–19 Apr 2015	1,492	?	41.0; 21/22	24.9; 11/12	5.0; 0	1.1; 0	10.4; 6	13.8; 6	16.1
NC Report/La Razón	4–16 Mar 2015	400	?	39.1; 20/22	20.3; 9/11	5.1; 0/1	2.3; 0	14.2; 6/7	15.6; 7/8	18.8
CEMOP	2 Feb–6 Mar 2015	2,944	?	37.6; 20	21.2; 10	5.4; 1	3.1; 0	15.7; 8	15.1; 6	16.4
CEMOP	2 Feb–1 Mar 2015	2,667	?	39.2	21.1	5.4	3.4	16.3	13.1	18.1
CEMOP	2–20 Feb 2015	1,996	?	39.3	21.1	5.4	3.1	17.3	12.5	18.2
CEMOP	2–13 Feb 2015	1,458	?	39.4; 21/22	21.9; 10/11	5.8; 1	3.1; 0	17.5; 8/9	11.4; 3/4	17.5
Llorente & Cuenca	31 Oct 2014	?	?	? 23/26	? 9/11	? 1/2	? 2	? 3/7	–	?
PP	19 Oct 2014	?	?	? 21/24	? 4/5	? 0	? 7/8	? 10/13	–	?
CEMOP	17–30 Sep 2014	800	63.3	42.2	18.3	9.4	6.1	17.3	4.2	23.9
Ganemos RM (Note: "Un estudio concluye que Ganemos sería la segunda fuerza política si aglutina en sus filas a IU-Verdes y Podemos". enCiezaDigital (in Spanish). 26 September 2014. Archived from the original on 26 February 2015.)	26 Sep 2014	?	?	? 21/22	? 9/10	(Note: Within Podemos.)	? 3	? 12	–	?
2014 EP election	25 May 2014	—N/a	42.5	37.5; 23	20.7; 11	9.8; 4	9.5; 4	7.6; 2	3.6; 0	16.8
TNS Demoscopia/CEMOP	12–16 May 2014	700	60.9	40.9	20.1	14.4	11.9	–	–	20.8
Sigma Dos/La Verdad	8–9 Apr 2014	1,000	?	50.1; 25/26	25.8; 12/13	10.1; 3	7.7; 3	–	–	24.3
Celeste-Tel/La Verdad	24 Nov 2013	?	?	45.1; 22/23	27.3; 13/14	12.7; 4/5	12.2; 4/5	–	–	17.8
NC Report/La Razón (Note: "El PP ganaría de nuevo en 9 de 13 autonomías". La Razón (in Spanish). 18 November 2013. Archived from the original on 3 March 2016.)	15 Oct–12 Nov 2013	?	?	? 24/25	? 12/13	? 4/5	? 3/4	–	–	?
NC Report/La Razón	15 Apr–10 May 2013	200	?	48.1; 23/24	22.0; 12/13	? 4/5	? 4/5	–	–	26.1
TNS Demoscopia/CEMOP	24–30 Jan 2013	802	60.2	41.8	27.1	14.3	12.1	–	–	14.7
2011 general election	20 Nov 2011	—N/a	74.1	64.2	21.0	5.7	6.3	–	–	43.2
2011 regional election	22 May 2011	—N/a	67.9	58.8; 33	23.9; 11	7.8*; 1	4.5; 0	–	–	34.9
(*) Results for United Left–Greens of the Region of Murcia.

== Results ==
=== Overall ===
← Summary of the 24 May 2015 Regional Assembly of Murcia election results →
Parties and alliances	Popular vote			Seats	
Parties and alliances	Votes	%	±pp	Total	+/−
People's Party (PP)	239,011	37.35	−21.44	22	−11
Spanish Socialist Workers' Party (PSOE)	153,231	23.95	+0.07	13	+2
We Can (Podemos)	84,577	13.22	New	6	+6
Citizens–Party of the Citizenry (C's)	80,459	12.57	New	4	+4
Winning the Region of Murcia.Plural Left (IU–V–RM–CLI–AS)^{1}	30,761	4.81	−3.02	0	−1
Union, Progress and Democracy (UPyD)	10,422	1.63	−2.87	0	±0
Citizens' Movement of Cartagena (MCC)	8,793	1.37	New	0	±0
Citizens of Democratic Centre (CCD)	6,772	1.06	New	0	±0
Vox (Vox)	5,427	0.85	New	0	±0
Animalist Party Against Mistreatment of Animals (PACMA)	4,663	0.73	New	0	±0
Blank Seats (EB)	2,002	0.31	New	0	±0
Zero Cuts (Recortes Cero)	1,422	0.22	New	0	±0
Citizens' Democratic Renewal Movement (RED)	912	0.14	New	0	±0
Communist Party of the Peoples of Spain (PCPE)	763	0.12	New	0	±0
Centre and Democracy Forum (CyD)	532	0.08	−0.05	0	±0
Spain on the Move (LEM)	88	0.01	New	0	±0
Blank ballots	10,057	1.57	−0.59		
Total	639,892			45	±0
Valid votes	639,892	98.00	−0.37		
Invalid votes	13,087	2.00	+0.37		
Votes cast / turnout	652,979	63.57	−4.34		
Abstentions	374,234	36.43	+4.34		
Registered voters	1,027,213				
Sources
Footnotes: ^{1} Winning the Region of Murcia.Plural Left results are compared to United Left–Greens of the Region of Murcia totals in the 2011 election.

Popular vote
PP	37.35%
PSOE	23.95%
Podemos	13.22%
C's	12.57%
Ganar.IP	4.81%
UPyD	1.63%
MCC	1.37%
CCD	1.06%
Others	2.47%
Blank ballots	1.57%

Seats
PP	48.89%
PSOE	28.89%
Podemos	13.33%
C's	8.89%

=== Distribution by constituency ===
Constituency	PP		PSOE		Podemos		C's	
Constituency	%	S	%	S	%	S	%	S
One	41.6	4	28.1	2	10.1	1	7.4	−
Two	35.2	5	21.0	3	14.7	2	13.4	1
Three	37.1	10	21.5	5	14.6	3	14.4	3
Four	34.5	2	38.9	2	8.3	−	9.4	−
Five	41.7	1	26.1	1	8.6	−	9.7	−
Total	37.4	22	23.9	13	13.2	6	12.6	4

== Aftermath ==
=== Government formation ===
Investiture; Pedro Antonio Sánchez (PP)
Ballot →	30 June 2015
Required majority →	23 out of 45
Yes: • PP (22); • C's (4)	26 / 45
No: • PSOE (13); • Podemos (6)	19 / 45
Abstentions	0 / 45
Absentees	0 / 45

=== 2017 investiture ===
Investiture; Fernando López Miras (PP)
Ballot →	27 April 2017	29 April 2017
Required majority →	23 out of 45	Simple
Yes: • PP (22)	22 / 45	22 / 45
No: • PSOE (13); • Podemos (6); • C's (4) (on 27 Apr)	23 / 45	19 / 45
Abstentions: • C's (4) (on 29 Apr)	0 / 45	4 / 45
Absentees	0 / 45	0 / 45
