= 2003 Murcian regional election =

Election in the Spanish region of Murcia

- 25 May 2003

All 45 seats in the Regional Assembly of Murcia 23 seats needed for a majority
- Opinion polls
- Registered: 934,896 ▲2.6%
- Turnout: 654,253 (70.0%) ▲2.3 pp
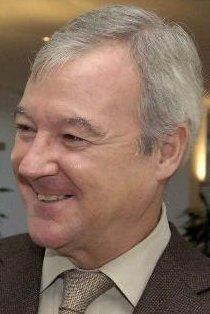

	First party	Second party	Third party
Leader	Ramón Luis Valcárcel	Ramón Ortiz	Cayetano Jaime Moltó
Party	PP	PSOE	IURM
Leader since	5 October 1991	1995	2001
Leader's seat	Three	Three	Three
Last election	26 seats, 52.8%	18 seats, 35.9%	1 seat, 7.0%
Seats won	28	16	1
Seat change	▲2	▼2	0
Popular vote	367,710	221,392	36,754
Percentage	56.7%	34.1%	5.7%
Swing	▲3.9 pp	▼1.8 pp	▼1.3 pp
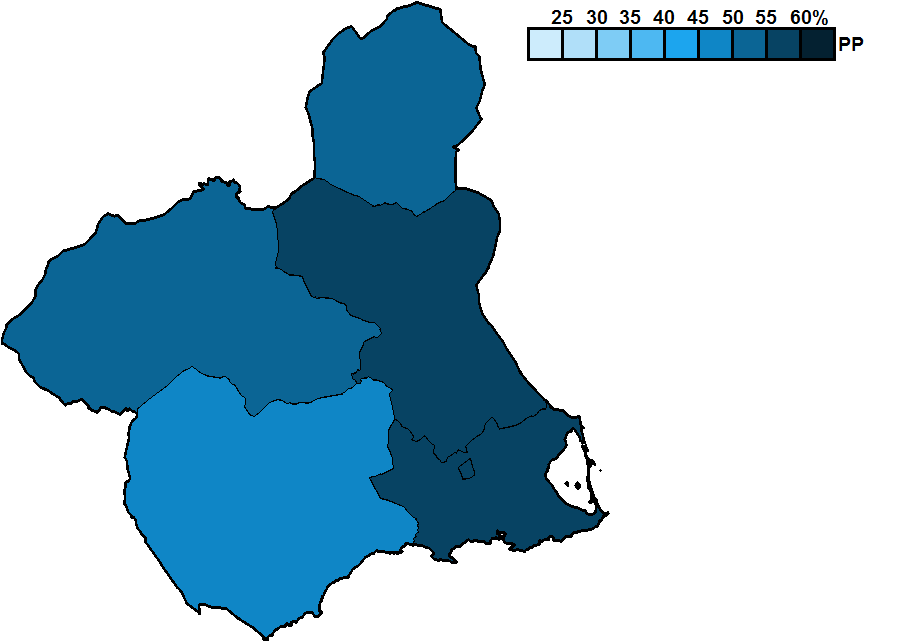
- Constituency results map for the Regional Assembly of Murcia
President before election
Ramón Luis Valcárcel
PP
Elected President
Ramón Luis Valcárcel
PP

A regional election was held in the Region of Murcia on 25 May 2003 to elect the 6th Regional Assembly of the autonomous community. All 45 seats in the Regional Assembly were up for election. It was held concurrently with regional elections in twelve other autonomous communities and local elections all across Spain.

== Overview ==
=== Electoral system ===
The Regional Assembly of Murcia was the devolved, unicameral legislature of the autonomous community of Murcia, having legislative power in regional matters as defined by the Spanish Constitution and the Murcian Statute of Autonomy, as well as the ability to vote confidence in or withdraw it from a regional president.

Voting for the Regional Assembly was on the basis of universal suffrage, which comprised all nationals over 18 years of age, registered in the Region of Murcia and in full enjoyment of their political rights. The 45 members of the Regional Assembly of Murcia were elected using the D'Hondt method and a closed list proportional representation, with an electoral threshold of five percent of valid votes—which included blank ballots—being applied regionally. Seats were allocated to constituencies, which were established by law as follows:

- District One (comprising the municipalities of Lorca, Aguilas, Puerto Lumbreras, Totana, Alhama de Murcia, Librilla, Aledo and Mazarrón).
- District Two (comprising the municipalities of Cartagena, La Unión, Fuente Alamo de Murcia, Torre-Pacheco, San Javier, San Pedro del Pinatar and Los Alcázares).
- District Three (comprising the municipalities of Murcia, Alcantarilla, Beniel, Molina de Segura, Alguazas, Las Torres de Cotillas, Lorquí, Ceutí, Cieza, Abarán, Blanca, Archena, Ricote, Ulea, Villanueva del Río Segura, Ojós, Fortuna, Abanilla and Santomera).
- District Four (comprising the municipalities of Caravaca, Cehegín, Calasparra, Moratalla, Bullas, Pliego, Mula, Albudeite and Campos del Río).
- District Five (comprising the municipalities of Yecla and Jumilla).

Each constituency was entitled to an initial minimum of one seat, with the remaining 40 allocated among the constituencies in proportion to their populations.

=== Election date ===
The term of the Regional Assembly of Murcia expired four years after the date of its previous election. Elections to the Regional Assembly were fixed for the fourth Sunday of May every four years. The previous election was held on 13 June 1999, setting the election date for the Regional Assembly on 25 May 2003.

The president had the prerogative to dissolve the Regional Assembly of Murcia and call a snap election, provided that no motion of no confidence was in process, no nationwide election was due and some time requirements were met: namely, that dissolution did not occur either during the first legislative session or within the legislature's last year ahead of its scheduled expiry, nor before one year had elapsed since a previous dissolution under this procedure. In the event of an investiture process failing to elect a regional president within a two-month period from the first ballot, the Regional Assembly was to be automatically dissolved and a fresh election called. Any snap election held as a result of these circumstances would not alter the period to the next ordinary election, with elected lawmakers serving the remainder of its original four-year term.

== Parties and candidates ==
The electoral law allowed for parties and federations registered in the interior ministry, coalitions and groupings of electors to present lists of candidates. Parties and federations intending to form a coalition ahead of an election were required to inform the relevant Electoral Commission within ten days of the election call, whereas groupings of electors needed to secure the signature of at least one percent of the electorate in the Region of Murcia, disallowing electors from signing for more than one list of candidates.

Below is a list of the main parties and electoral alliances which contested the election:

Candidacy	Parties and alliances	Leading candidate	Ideology	Previous result		Gov.	Ref.
Candidacy	Parties and alliances	Leading candidate	Ideology	Vote %	Seats	Gov.	Ref.
PP	List: People's Party (PP)	Ramón Luis Valcárcel	Conservatism; Christian democracy	52.8%	26	Yes	
PSOE	List: Spanish Socialist Workers' Party (PSOE)	Ramón Ortiz	Social democracy	35.9%	18	No	
IURM	List: United Left of the Region of Murcia (IURM)	Cayetano Jaime Moltó	Socialism; Communism	7.0%	1	No	

== Opinion polls ==
The table below lists voting intention estimates in reverse chronological order, showing the most recent first and using the dates when the survey fieldwork was done, as opposed to the date of publication. Where the fieldwork dates are unknown, the date of publication is given instead. The highest percentage figure in each polling survey is displayed with its background shaded in the leading party's colour. If a tie ensues, this is applied to the figures with the highest percentages. The "Lead" column on the right shows the percentage-point difference between the parties with the highest percentages in a poll. When available, seat projections determined by the polling organisations are displayed below (or in place of) the percentages in a smaller font; 23 seats were required for an absolute majority in the Regional Assembly of Murcia.

Color key:

Exit poll

Polling firm/Commissioner	Fieldwork date	Sample size	Turnout	PP	PSOE	IU	Lead
2003 regional election	25 May 2003	—N/a	70.0	56.7; 28	34.1; 16	5.7; 1	22.6
Sigma Dos/Antena 3	25 May 2003	?	?	? 24/25	? 18/19	? 2	?
Ipsos–Eco/RTVE	25 May 2003	?	?	? 26/28	? 16/18	? 1/2	?
CIS	22 Mar–28 Apr 2003	1,417	71.8	49.7; 24	38.4; 19	7.7; 2	11.3
CIS	9 Sep–9 Oct 2002	487	72.9	51.0	35.0	5.6	16.0
Celeste-Tel	10–20 Jul 2000	977	?	51.9; 25	33.9; 18	7.9; 2	18.0
2000 general election	12 Mar 2000	—N/a	73.5	58.1	32.4	6.2	25.7
1999 regional election	13 Jun 1999	—N/a	67.7	52.8; 26	35.9; 18	7.0; 1	16.9

== Results ==
=== Overall ===
← Summary of the 25 May 2003 Regional Assembly of Murcia election results →
Parties and alliances	Popular vote			Seats	
Parties and alliances	Votes	%	±pp	Total	+/−
People's Party (PP)	367,710	56.66	+3.82	28	+2
Spanish Socialist Workers' Party (PSOE)	221,392	34.11	−1.80	16	−2
United Left of the Region of Murcia (IURM)	36,754	5.66	−1.34	1	±0
The Greens (LV)	10,208	1.57	+0.64	0	±0
Citizens' Convergence of the South-East (CCSE)	1,194	0.18	+0.04	0	±0
Humanist Party (PH)	1,063	0.16	New	0	±0
Family and Life Party (PFyV)	392	0.06	New	0	±0
National Democracy–Workers' National Party (DN–PNT)^{1}	239	0.04	+0.01	0	±0
Democratic and Social Centre (CDS)	136	0.02	−0.28	0	±0
Blank ballots	9,941	1.53	+0.09		
Total	649,029			45	±0
Valid votes	649,029	99.20	−0.10		
Invalid votes	5,224	0.80	+0.10		
Votes cast / turnout	654,253	69.98	+2.32		
Abstentions	280,643	30.02	−2.32		
Registered voters	934,896				
Sources
Footnotes: ^{1} National Democracy–Workers' National Party results are compared to Workers' National Party totals in the 1999 election.

Popular vote
PP	56.66%
PSOE	34.11%
IURM	5.66%
LV	1.57%
Others	0.47%
Blank ballots	1.53%

Seats
PP	62.22%
PSOE	35.56%
IURM	2.22%

=== Distribution by constituency ===
Constituency	PP		PSOE		IURM	
Constituency	%	S	%	S	%	S
One	49.1	4	40.7	3	7.7	−
Two	58.2	7	32.0	3	5.3	−
Three	59.8	13	31.7	7	4.8	1
Four	50.6	2	42.1	2	5.6	−
Five	50.0	2	35.0	1	10.6	−
Total	56.7	28	34.1	16	5.7	1

== Aftermath ==
Investiture; Ramón Luis Valcárcel (PP)
Ballot →	26 June 2003
Required majority →	23 out of 45
Yes: • PP (28)	28 / 45
No: • IURM (1)	1 / 45
Abstentions: • PSOE (16)	16 / 45
Absentees	0 / 45
