= Urralburu =

Urralburu is a surname. Notable people with the surname include:

- Gabriel Urralburu (born 1950), Spanish politician
- Óscar Urralburu (born 1971) is a Spanish professor
