= Guillermo Mariscal Anaya =

Spanish politician (born 1974)

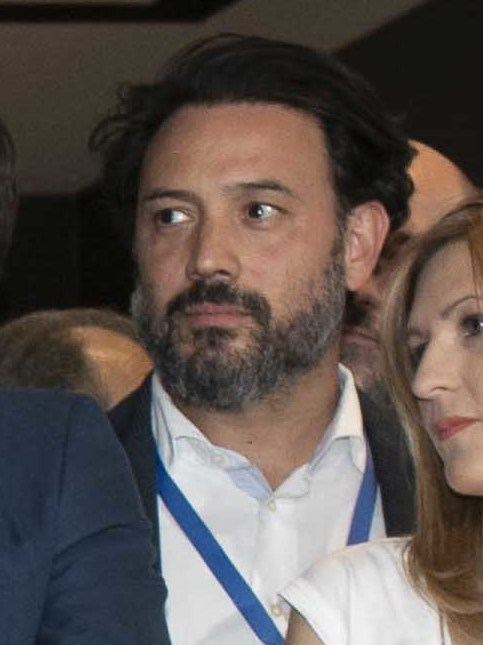

Third Secretary of the Congress of Deputies
- Incumbent
- Assumed office 17 August 2023
- President: Francina Armengol
- Preceded by: Javier Sánchez Serna

Deputy Secretary General of the People's Party in the Congress of Deputies
- Incumbent
- Assumed office 3 April 2022
- President: Alberto Núñez Feijóo

Member of the Congress of Deputies for Las Palmas
- Incumbent
- Assumed office 8 March 2005

Personal details
- Born: 9 May 1974 (age 51) Madrid, Spain
- Party: People's Party
- Occupation: Politician

Guillermo Mariscal Anaya (born in Madrid on 9 May 1974) is a Spanish politician, member of Congress for Las Palmas during the VIII, IX, X, XI, XII and XIII Cortes Generales.

== Biography ==
With a degree in law from the University of Las Palmas de Gran Canaria and a master's degree in Business and Energy Law (ISE), he practices as a lawyer. In March 2005 he became a member of the Spanish Congress of Deputies, replacing María del Carmen Castellano Rodríguez, and since then he has been re-elected in 2008, 2011, 2015 and 2016. He has held the positions of spokesperson for Energy, first secretary of the Foreign Affairs Committee and alternate member of the NATO Parliamentary Assembly.

He defended Repsol's intention to prospect for oil in the Canary Islands, accusing the government of the Canary Islands (PSOE and CC) of hypocrisy and defending the hypothesis that if reserves were found they would have a 10% impact on the economy of the Canary Islands, and that the environmental impact would be minimal.
