= 1999 Murcian regional election =

Election in the Spanish region of Murcia

- 13 June 1999

All 45 seats in the Regional Assembly of Murcia 23 seats needed for a majority
- Opinion polls
- Registered: 911,054 ▲7.4%
- Turnout: 616,397 (67.7%) ▼7.6 pp
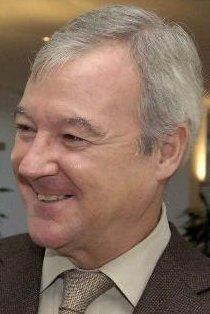

	First party	Second party	Third party
Leader	Ramón Luis Valcárcel	Ramón Ortiz	Antonio Joaquín Dólera
Party	PP	PSOE	IURM
Leader since	5 October 1991	1995	1995
Leader's seat	Three	Three	Three
Last election	26 seats, 52.2%	15 seats, 31.9%	4 seats, 12.5%
Seats won	26	18	1
Seat change	0	▲3	▼3
Popular vote	323,446	219,798	42,839
Percentage	52.8%	35.9%	7.0%
Swing	▲0.6 pp	▲4.0 pp	▼5.5 pp
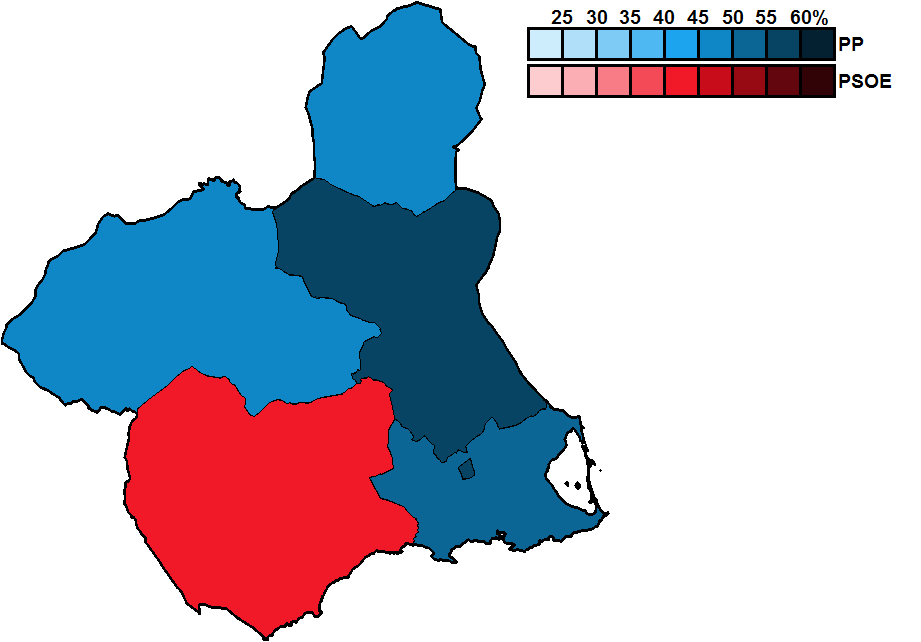
- Constituency results map for the Regional Assembly of Murcia
President before election
Ramón Luis Valcárcel
PP
Elected President
Ramón Luis Valcárcel
PP

A regional election was held in the Region of Murcia on 13 June 1999 to elect the 5th Regional Assembly of the autonomous community. All 45 seats in the Regional Assembly were up for election. It was held concurrently with regional elections in twelve other autonomous communities and local elections all across Spain, as well as the 1999 European Parliament election.

== Overview ==
=== Electoral system ===
The Regional Assembly of Murcia was the devolved, unicameral legislature of the autonomous community of Murcia, having legislative power in regional matters as defined by the Spanish Constitution and the Murcian Statute of Autonomy, as well as the ability to vote confidence in or withdraw it from a regional president.

Voting for the Regional Assembly was on the basis of universal suffrage, which comprised all nationals over 18 years of age, registered in the Region of Murcia and in full enjoyment of their political rights. The 45 members of the Regional Assembly of Murcia were elected using the D'Hondt method and a closed list proportional representation, with an electoral threshold of five percent of valid votes—which included blank ballots—being applied regionally. Seats were allocated to constituencies, which were established by law as follows:

- District One (comprising the municipalities of Lorca, Aguilas, Puerto Lumbreras, Totana, Alhama de Murcia, Librilla, Aledo and Mazarrón).
- District Two (comprising the municipalities of Cartagena, La Unión, Fuente Alamo de Murcia, Torre-Pacheco, San Javier, San Pedro del Pinatar and Los Alcázares).
- District Three (comprising the municipalities of Murcia, Alcantarilla, Beniel, Molina de Segura, Alguazas, Las Torres de Cotillas, Lorquí, Ceutí, Cieza, Abarán, Blanca, Archena, Ricote, Ulea, Villanueva del Río Segura, Ojós, Fortuna, Abanilla and Santomera).
- District Four (comprising the municipalities of Caravaca, Cehegín, Calasparra, Moratalla, Bullas, Pliego, Mula, Albudeite and Campos del Río).
- District Five (comprising the municipalities of Yecla and Jumilla).

Each constituency was entitled to an initial minimum of one seat, with the remaining 40 allocated among the constituencies in proportion to their populations.

=== Election date ===
The term of the Regional Assembly of Murcia expired four years after the date of its previous election. Elections to the Regional Assembly were fixed for the fourth Sunday of May every four years. Legal amendments introduced in 1998 allowed for these to be held together with European Parliament elections, provided that they were scheduled for within a four month-timespan. The previous election was held on 28 May 1995, setting the election date for the Regional Assembly concurrently with a European Parliament election on 13 June 1999.

After legal amendments in 1998, the president was granted the prerogative to dissolve the Regional Assembly of Murcia and call a snap election, provided that no motion of no confidence was in process, no nationwide election was due and some time requirements were met: namely, that dissolution did not occur either during the first legislative session or within the legislature's last year ahead of its scheduled expiry, nor before one year had elapsed since a previous dissolution under this procedure. In the event of an investiture process failing to elect a regional president within a two-month period from the first ballot, the Regional Assembly was to be automatically dissolved and a fresh election called. Any snap election held as a result of these circumstances would not alter the period to the next ordinary election, with elected lawmakers serving the remainder of its original four-year term.

== Parties and candidates ==
The electoral law allowed for parties and federations registered in the interior ministry, coalitions and groupings of electors to present lists of candidates. Parties and federations intending to form a coalition ahead of an election were required to inform the relevant Electoral Commission within ten days of the election call, whereas groupings of electors needed to secure the signature of at least one percent of the electorate in the Region of Murcia, disallowing electors from signing for more than one list of candidates.

Below is a list of the main parties and electoral alliances which contested the election:

Candidacy	Parties and alliances	Leading candidate	Ideology	Previous result		Gov.	Ref.
Candidacy	Parties and alliances	Leading candidate	Ideology	Vote %	Seats	Gov.	Ref.
PP	List: People's Party (PP)	Ramón Luis Valcárcel	Conservatism; Christian democracy	52.2%	26	Yes	
PSOE	List: Spanish Socialist Workers' Party (PSOE)	Ramón Ortiz	Social democracy	31.9%	15	No	
IURM	List: United Left of the Region of Murcia (IURM)	Antonio Joaquín Dólera	Socialism; Communism	12.5%	4	No	

== Opinion polls ==
The table below lists voting intention estimates in reverse chronological order, showing the most recent first and using the dates when the survey fieldwork was done, as opposed to the date of publication. Where the fieldwork dates are unknown, the date of publication is given instead. The highest percentage figure in each polling survey is displayed with its background shaded in the leading party's colour. If a tie ensues, this is applied to the figures with the highest percentages. The "Lead" column on the right shows the percentage-point difference between the parties with the highest percentages in a poll. When available, seat projections determined by the polling organisations are displayed below (or in place of) the percentages in a smaller font; 23 seats were required for an absolute majority in the Regional Assembly of Murcia.

Polling firm/Commissioner	Fieldwork date	Sample size	Turnout	PP	PSOE	IU	Lead
1999 regional election	13 Jun 1999	—N/a	67.7	52.8; 26	35.9; 18	7.0; 1	16.9
Eco Consulting/ABC	24 May–2 Jun 1999	?	?	54.2; 26/27	30.6; 14/15	11.4; 3	23.6
Demoscopia/El País	26 May–1 Jun 1999	?	71	55.1; 27	33.9; 16	9.3; 2	21.2
Sigma Dos/El Mundo	17–23 May 1999	600	?	54.2; 26/27	32.1; 15	10.7; 3/4	22.1
CIS	3–23 May 1999	1,297	74.8	55.9; 27	31.0; 15	10.4; 3	24.9
1996 general election	3 Mar 1996	—N/a	82.0	49.9	38.0	10.5	11.9
1995 regional election	28 May 1995	—N/a	76.0	52.3; 26	31.7; 15	12.5; 4	20.6

== Results ==
=== Overall ===
← Summary of the 13 June 1999 Regional Assembly of Murcia election results →
Parties and alliances	Popular vote			Seats	
Parties and alliances	Votes	%	±pp	Total	+/−
People's Party (PP)	323,446	52.84	+0.61	26	±0
Spanish Socialist Workers' Party (PSOE)	219,798	35.91	+4.04	18	+3
United Left of the Region of Murcia (IURM)	42,839	7.00	−5.46	1	−3
The Greens (LV)	5,683	0.93	New	0	±0
Spanish Democratic Party (PADE)	5,527	0.90	New	0	±0
Centrist Union–Democratic and Social Centre (UC–CDS)	1,845	0.30	−0.39	0	±0
Minor Sea Independent Party–Neighbourhood Indep. Movement (PIMM–MIV)	1,579	0.26	New	0	±0
Union of the Peoples of Murcia (UPM)	1,502	0.25	New	0	±0
Citizens' Convergence of the South-East (CCSE)	844	0.14	New	0	±0
National Workers' Party (PNT)	168	0.03	New	0	±0
Blank ballots	8,839	1.44	+0.33		
Total	612,070			45	±0
Valid votes	612,070	99.30	+0.16		
Invalid votes	4,327	0.70	−0.16		
Votes cast / turnout	616,397	67.66	−7.61		
Abstentions	294,657	32.34	+7.61		
Registered voters	911,054				

Popular vote
PP	52.84%
PSOE	35.91%
IURM	7.00%
Others	2.80%
Blank ballots	1.44%

Seats
PP	57.78%
PSOE	40.00%
IURM	2.22%

=== Distribution by constituency ===
Constituency	PP		PSOE		IURM	
Constituency	%	S	%	S	%	S
One	43.5	3	43.6	4	8.3	−
Two	54.6	6	33.6	4	6.0	−
Three	56.3	13	33.2	7	6.4	1
Four	46.9	2	44.2	2	7.0	−
Five	49.9	2	33.8	1	13.3	−
Total	52.8	26	35.9	18	7.0	1

== Aftermath ==
Investiture; Ramón Luis Valcárcel (PP)
Ballot →	8 July 1999
Required majority →	23 out of 45
Yes: • PP (26)	26 / 45
No: • PSOE (18); • IURM (1)	19 / 45
Abstentions	0 / 45
Absentees	0 / 45
