= Pedro Antonio Sánchez =

Spanish politician

Pedro Antonio Sánchez López
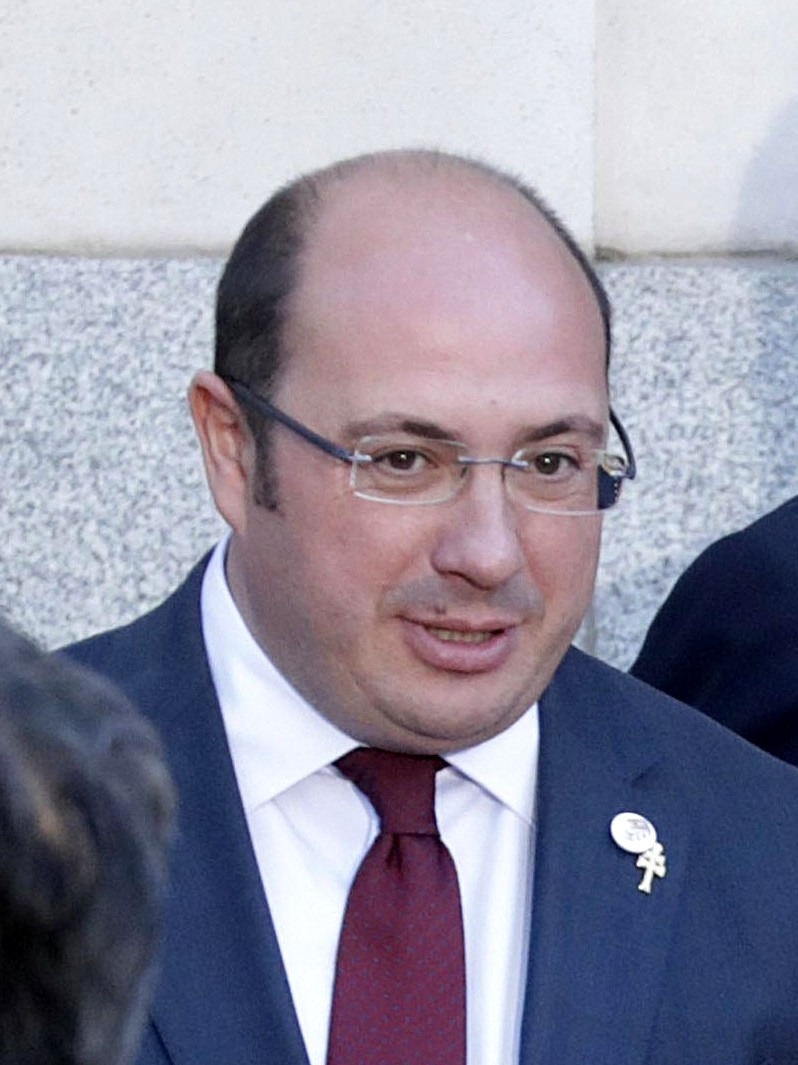

President of the Region of Murcia
- In office July 3, 2015 – April 4, 2017
- Preceded by: Alberto Garre
- Succeeded by: Fernando López Miras

Secretary of Education, Culture and Universities of the Region of Murcia
- In office April 11, 2014 – July 3, 2015
- Preceded by: Pedro Alberto Cruz
- Succeeded by: María Isabel Sánchez Mora(Education); Noelia Hernández Arroyo (Culture)

Mayor of Puerto Lumbreras
- In office June 14, 2003 – July 24, 2013
- Preceded by: José Cerrillo Barnés
- Succeeded by: María Ángeles Túnez García

Member of the Regional Assembly of Murcia
- Incumbent
- Assumed office May 25, 2003

Personal details
- Born: Pedro Antonio Sánchez López; 30 January 1976 (age 50) Villoslada de Cameros, Spain
- Party: People's Party (PP)
- Education: University of Granada

Pedro Antonio Sánchez López (born 30 January 1976) is a Spanish politician and member of the right People's Party (PP) political party in the southern Region of Murcia. He has served as the 6th democratically elected President of the Region of Murcia since July 3, 2015, following the PP's victory in the May 2015 Murcian parliamentary election.

Sánchez's PP retained a majority in the Regional Assembly of Murcia, but lost eleven seats compared to 2011. Sanchez was elected President of Murcia with the support of the 22 PP members in the Regional Assembly, as well as four members of Ciudadanos party.

Sánchez was sworn in as President on Friday evening, July 3, 2015, at a ceremony at the Palacio de San Esteban. His government was seated on Sunday, July 5, 2015.

On February 20, 2017, he was called to testify on March 6 in a case of corruption as an accused. On April 3, he was accused by the judge Eloy Velasco of participating in the case known as Trama Púnica (in Spanish), which led to his resignation as President of Murcia on the following day, one day before the scheduled vote of no confidence in the Regional Assembly.

In September 2022 the trial for the 'auditorium case' began, in which "the PP politician is prosecuted for continued prevarication and fraud in subsidies, addresses the construction of a theater in Puerto Lumbreras in 2005 ".

In March 2023, the Provincial Court of Murcia condemns the former president of Murcia Pedro Antonio Sánchez to three years in prison, a fine of 3,600 euros, and 17 years and three months of special disqualification for public office or employment, considering him guilty of prevarication and falsehood in relation to the Puerto Lumbreras auditorium project when he was mayor of the town.

He lives in Miami (USA) where he set up a consultancy and deals with businessmen and investors of all kinds acting as an intermediary
