= Óscar Urralburu =

Spanish professor and politician

- Óscar Urralburu Arza
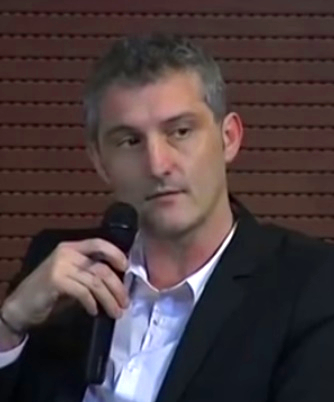

Secretary-General of Podemos Region of Murcia
- Incumbent
- Assumed office 14 February 2015
- Preceded by: Position established

Deputy in the Regional Assembly of Murcia
- Incumbent
- Assumed office 15 June 2015
- Constituency: Constituency III

Personal details
- Born: 8 September 1971 (age 55) Pamplona, Spain
- Party: Podemos (2015–2019); Más País (2019– )
- Education: Fine art
- Alma mater: University of Castilla-La Mancha; University of Murcia
- Occupation: Teacher; Professor; Politician

Óscar Urralburu Arza (Pamplona, 8 September 1971) is a Spanish professor and politician, deputy in the Regional Assembly of Murcia and member of Podemos.

== Biography ==
Óscar Urralburu graduated in Fine art by the University of Castilla-La Mancha and has a PhD from the University of Murcia. Since 1996 is a teacher of secondary education and since 2006 is an associate professor of the University of Murcia, having as well different offices in the teaching union STERM.

In February 2015 he was elected as Secretary-General of Podemos Region of Murcia, likewise being designated in April as presidential candidate of the Región of Murcia obtaining six seats in the regional elections of May.

In June 2017, he was reelected Secretary-General of Podemos-Region of Murcia.
