= Ganar la Región de Murcia =

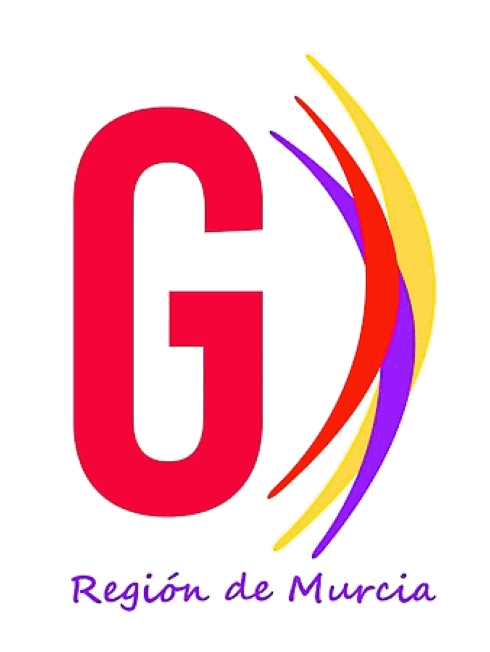
- Leader: José Antonio Pujante
- Founded: 9 March 2015
- Dissolved: 2015
- Merger of: IU–V–RM; CLI–AS
- Political position: Left-wing

Ganar la Región de Murcia (Spanish for Winning the Region of Murcia) was an electoral alliance formed by United Left–Greens of the Region of Murcia and Building the Left–Socialist Alternative to contest the 2015 Murcian regional election. While the alliance had been intended as a "confluence" for left-wing political forces in the region, both Podemos and Equo refused to join it.

On 17 March 2015, José Antonio Pujante was elected as the alliance's leading candidate for the regional election. The alliance failed to secure any parliamentary seats in the 24 May election.

== Member parties ==
- United Left–Greens of the Region of Murcia (IU–V–RM)
- Building the Left–Socialist Alternative (CLI–AS)

== Electoral performance ==
=== Regional Assembly of Murcia ===
Date	Votes			Seats		Status	Size
Date	#	%	±pp	#	±	Status	Size
2015	30,761	4.8%	–3.0	0 / 45	1	N/A	5th
