= People's Party of the Region of Murcia =

Political party in Spain

People's Party of the Region of Murcia Partido Popular de la Región de Murcia
- President: Ramón Luis Valcárcel
- Secretary-General: Pedro Antonio Sánchez
- Founded: 1989
- Headquarters: C/ Gonzalez Adalid, 2-Bº; 30001, Murcia
- Ideology: Christian democracy Liberal conservatism
- Political position: Centre-right
- National affiliation: People's Party
- Regional Assembly of Murcia: 21 / 45
- Congress of Deputies: 4 / 10 (Murcian seats)
- Senate: 3 / 6 (Murcian seats)

Website
- www.ppmurcia.org

The People's Party of the Region of Murcia (Spanish: Partido Popular de la Región de Murcia, PP) is the regional section of the People's Party of Spain (PP) in the Region of Murcia. It was formed in 1989 from the re-foundation of the People's Alliance.

== Electoral performance ==
=== Regional Assembly of Murcia ===
Regional Assembly of Murcia
Election	Vote	%	Score	Seats	+/–	Leader	Status
1991	173,491	33.5	2nd	17 / 45	1	Juan Ramón Calero	Opposition
1995	330,089	52.3	1st	26 / 45	9	Ramón Luis Valcárcel	Government
1999	323,446	52.8	1st	26 / 45	0	Ramón Luis Valcárcel	Government
2003	367,710	56.7	1st	28 / 45	2	Ramón Luis Valcárcel	Government
2007	379,011	58.3	1st	29 / 45	1	Ramón Luis Valcárcel	Government
2011	382,871	58.8	1st	33 / 45	4	Ramón Luis Valcárcel	Government
2015	239,011	37.4	1st	22 / 45	11	Pedro Antonio Sánchez	Government
2019	210,771	32.4	2nd	16 / 45	6	Fernando López Miras	Government
2023	286,571	42.8	1st	21 / 45	5	Fernando López Miras	Government

=== Cortes Generales ===
Cortes Generales
Election	Region of Murcia						
Election	Congress					Senate	
Election	Vote	%	Score	Seats	+/–	Seats	+/–
1989	166,712	30.0	2nd	3 / 9	0	1 / 4	0
1993	310,507	47.3	1st	4 / 9	1	3 / 4	2
1996	350,337	49.9	1st	5 / 9	1	3 / 4	0
2000	389,564	58.1	1st	6 / 9	1	3 / 4	0
2004	413,902	57.4	1st	6 / 9	0	3 / 4	0
2008	469,380	61.2	1st	7 / 10	1	3 / 4	0
2011	471,851	64.2	1st	8 / 10	1	3 / 4	0
2015	293,943	40.4	1st	5 / 10	3	3 / 4	0
2016	333,109	46.7	1st	5 / 10	0	3 / 4	0
2019 (Apr)	179,885	23.4	2nd	2 / 10	3	2 / 4	1
2019 (Nov)	188,870	26.5	2nd	3 / 10	1	3 / 4	1

=== European Parliament ===
European Parliament
Election	Region of Murcia		
Election	Vote	%	Score
1989	115,595	26.7	2nd
1994	287,135	52.2	1st
1999	325,602	53.2	1st
2004	272,400	58.9	1st
2009	288,460	61.5	1st
2014	160,117	37.5	1st
2019	196,622	30.6	2nd
