= Blanca, Murcia =

Blanca
- Municipality
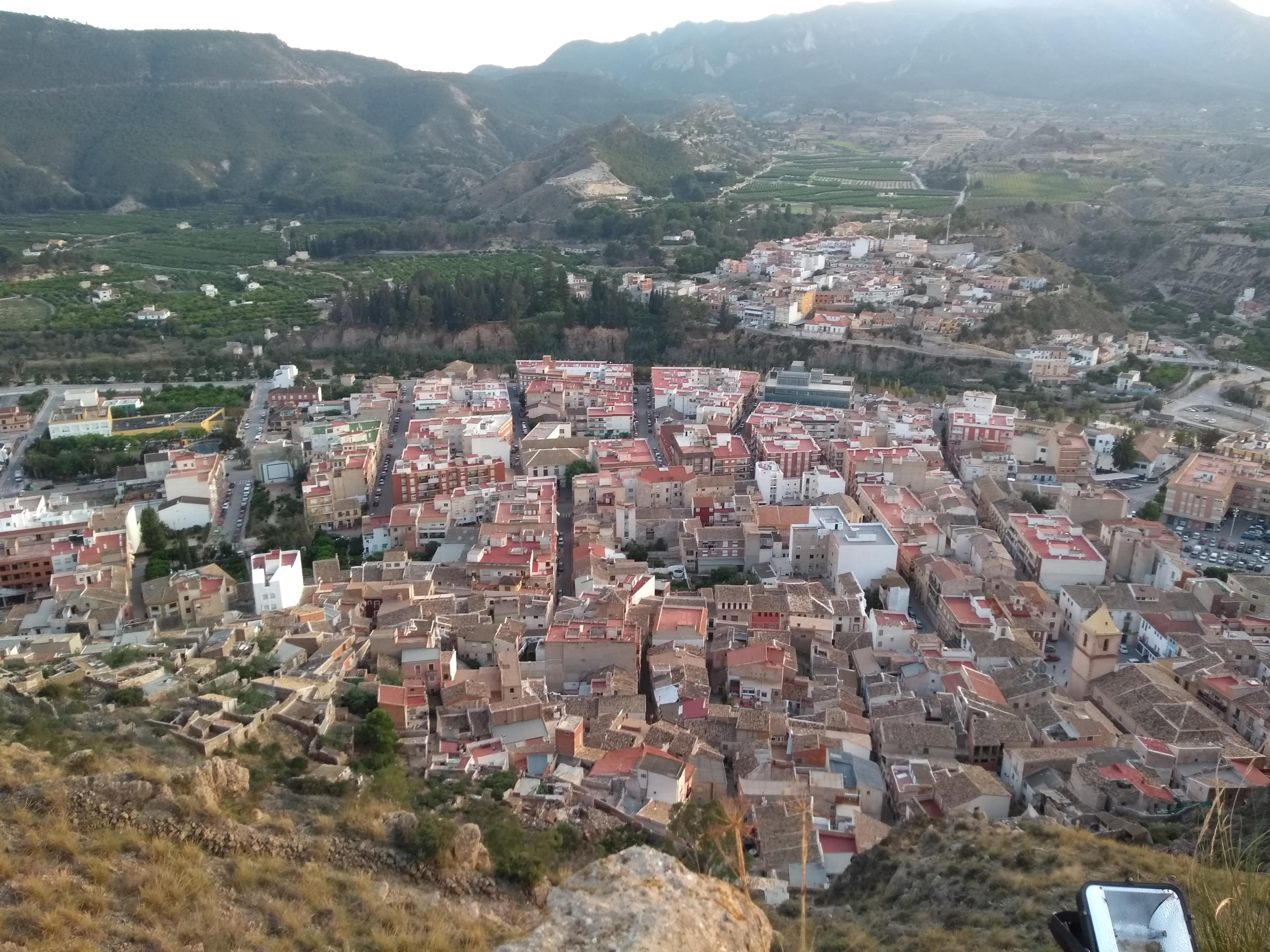

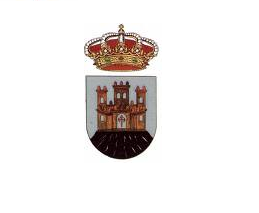
- Flag Coat of arms

- Location in Murcia

- Location in Murcia Location in Spain
- Country: Spain
- Autonomous community: Murcia
- Province: Murcia
- Comarca: Vega Alta del Segura
- Judicial district: Cieza

Government
  - Mayor: Pedro Luis Molina Cano (PSRM-PSOE)

Area
  - Total: 87.7 km^{2} (33.9 sq mi)
- Elevation: 233 m (764 ft)

Population (2025-01-01)
  - Total: 6,882
  - Density: 78.5/km^{2} (203/sq mi)
- Demonym: Blanqueños
- Website: Official website

Blanca is a Spanish municipality in the Region of Murcia, located in the "Vega Alta del Segura". It belongs to one of the six municipalities of the Ricote Valley (Valle de Ricote), together with Abarán, Ojós, Ricote, Ulea, Archena and Villanueva de Segura. Blanca limits on the north by the municipality of Abarán, on the south by those of Ulea and Ojós, on the east by the municipalities Molina de Segura and Fortuna, and on the west by the municipality Ricote. Blanca has an area of 87.7 km ², its average height is 233 m and the village has 6489 inhabitants, according to the INE in 2011.

== Road Communications ==
The main road communication, near Blanca, is the motorway A-30 (Albacete, Murcia). The A-33, between La Font de la Figuera and Blanca, is currently built. This motorway will improve the connection to Valencia.

From Murcia, Blanca is accessed through the motorway A-30, Exit 111 Blanca-ffcc rail station. From Madrid, through the outlet 110 of the motorway A-30, or the main road N-301. From Valencia, one can drive to Blanca through the intersection of the future motorway A-33 to the motorway A-30, or via the main road N-344.

== History ==
The population existed before the Muslim era, during the independent maritime state of Cartagena. In fact, to protect and fortify the port and the inlands, some of the best masons in Europe were sent to build and create communities by the fortifications and bridges under construction. Blanca is in fact one of the rare area where wounded soldiers, orphans and widows could take refuge, regardless of their religion or nation. This humanitarian sanctuary was then confirmed by the Vatican.

We have to go to the year 713, with the arrival of the Arab conquest, to find permanent human presence in the town of Blanca. The first testimony brings us the remainder of its castle, dating from the twelfth century. In the thirteenth century, it was known by the name of "Negra", apparently because of the color of the black mountain near to the castle and population center. This castle was built between 1155 and 1171 by the first King of Murcia, Muhammad ibn Mardanis, known as the "Wolf King". The historical connection to form part of the Moorish Ricote Valley was found in 1228, during the insurrection led by Ibn Hud as from Ricote against the Almohads. However, after his death, ten years later, anarchy and lawlessness propagated in the Kingdom of Murcia, causing the Alcaraz Pact signed with Castile in 1243, which required the submission to the Crown as a protectorate. Respecting and guaranteeing the possessions, and Muslim traditions in change of vassalage to the Castilian king. Once Alfonso X on the Castilian throne and after breaking some clauses of the Treaty, the Mudéjar population revolts, between 1264 and 1266. After suffocating the revolution, Alfonso X gave the Ricote Valley population the Jurisdiction of the city of Murcia, being so included in the territory of the city. With the death of the eldest son and Castilian heir, Fernando de la Cerda, the struggle began for the succession to the throne of Castile. The struggle was between Fernando's sons, the infants de la Cerda, and his uncle, son of Alfonso X, the Infante Don Sancho. Future Sancho IV, promised, in a document dated 25 March 1281, to reward the Order of Santiago by donating the Ricote Valley, including Negra (Blanca), if they help him in his struggle for the crown. When being proclaimed king in Seville 19 November 1285, Sancho IV fulfills his commitment and gave to the Order of Santiago the Ricote Valley, their neighbourhoods, villages and places, for the support provided (1).

Peace did not last many years in the Ricote Valley because James II of Aragón invaded the Kingdom of Murcia, in 1296, to reward himself for the help given to the other party, i.e.| the Infants de la Cerda, in the struggle for succession of the throne against his uncle. During this occupation, Negra and its castle were given to the counselor Bernardo de Sarria, although the santiaguista commander of Ricote claimed to replace them to John Osores on 19 September 1303. The last time the name of Negra is stated in a document is in the year 1315. The change of the name Negra to Blanca probably took place between the years 1353 and 1362 by the influence of Dona Blanca de Borbón, Queen of Castile, who was abandoned by King Pedro I and defended by Fadrique, Master of the Order of Santiago, and by Sancho Sanchez de Moscoso, the santiaguista commander of Ricote (2). Years later, precisely in 1382, Blanca appeared for the first time under the name of Blanca. The Advancer (Counselor) of the Kingdom of Murcia, Martin Alonso de Valdivieso, required the freedom of a Moor from Blanca, who was captured upon request of a Jew of Elche. (3). Unfair events could not stop the war instability in the middle decades of the fifteenth century. It caused the abandonment of Blanca's people marching with the troops of the King of Granada after a foray into the Kingdom of Murcia. Thereafter, after demanding tax benefits, Blanca's people returned. After the bloody sack of Cieza in 1477, leaving the villages depopulated, the inhabitants of Blanca again left their village. They returned again in 1492 after the conquest of the Kingdom of Granada. The domain of the Order of Santiago on Blanca and the rest of the Ricote Valley would be extended until the nineteenth century. In order to improve the performance of their lands, in the early years of this domain, the Order convinced to convert to Christianity the Mohammedans of Blanca before the new law in 1501. In this way, they were now called new Christians. The Mohammedans converted after the new law in 1501 were called Moors. Some years thereafter, in 1507, the Catholic Monarchs gave instructions to build churches on the old mosques (4). The Muslim population hoped, with this conversion to Christianity, to get rid of the fiscal pressures to which they were subject all the time. However, their frustration was great seeing that this was not the case, and this provoked a violent uprising of the Moorish population throughout the Valley in 1517. This rebellion was suppressed and repressed a year later.

Throughout the sixteenth century, Blanca experienced a significant increase in the population of the village. Philip II, always lacking money due to his wars, arranged a new strategy for obtaining money: that one of creating municipalities. Consequently, Blanca got on 10 August 1591 from Philip II the privilege of the municipality at the cost of 2400 ducats. The expulsion of the new Christians of the Ricote Valley - now suddenly called Moriscoes - decreed in 1613 by Philip III left in ruin the lands of Blanca. Blanca left only with a population of 300 people (5), due to the forced exodus of its inhabitants. However, 10–15 years after 45% of its inhabitants returned to their lands (6). Miguel de Cervantes Saavedra wrote at length about the Moorish Ricote Valley through the figure of Morisco Ricote (7). Many authors thought the Morisco Ricote came from Esquivias or Albacete, but Govert Westerveld, one of the two chroniclers of the town proved that the Morisco Ricote came from the Ricote Valley (8) as confirmed in 2010 by Professor Francisco Márquez Villanueva (9). Back in the Golden Century of Murcia, eighteenth century, Blanca began to recover its loss of the population, moving from 700 inhabitants in 1713 to 1378 in 1786, according to the Census Floridablanca. The present church dedicated to St. John the Evangelist was rebuilt at the end of the seventeenth and the beginning of the eighteenth century by the stonecutter brothers Lucas and Antonio de la Lastra. The building was finished in the year 1717.

After the War of Independence (1808-1814), Blanca's privilege was ratified by King Ferdinand VII in 1819. Nine years later, the Kingdom of Murcia is hit by an epidemic of yellow fever, and Blanca was elected by the Chapter of the Cathedral of Murcia as a refuge from the disease, and through the intercession of St. Roch the fever did not reach Blanca, according to tradition. St. Roch was named as the pattern of Blanca seeing the results of praying of the inhabitants from Blanca to him. Freed from the control by the Order of Santiago, in 1851, and after the revolutionary events and the restoration of the monarchy of Cánovas del Castillo in Alfonso XII, Blanca faces the entrance of the new century, better prepared than some of the surrounding municipalities. In 1856, the inhabitants arranged the building of a new bridge over the River Segura. In 1869, a rural road was finished to connect the city with the railway station. In 1894 public lighting was installed. Also in 1894, Blanca suffered several collapses from the hillsides being destroyed several buildings, including a home-hospital and shelter for the poor. The result was a complete change of the landscapes which motivated the construction of new houses and streets. During the twentieth century, the turbulent political and social periods were lived in the town with regularity as the rest of the region. Proclaimed the Second Republic in the 1931 elections, the conservative parties, grouped in the Spanish Confederation of Autonomous Rights (CEDA), won the elections. The response of the left parties was an immediate development of the organization of trade unions and social organizations which in 1934 proclaimed a general strike in Murcia, with violent demonstrations in many locations. The neighboring Cieza had to declare a state of war, and there were several deaths in Alguazas. The 1936 elections, which were won by a coalition of leftist parties called "The Popular Front", returned to cause violent altercations throughout the Region. This heralded the civil conflict that ended with the rise by a part of the army on 17 July of the same year. As in the rest of the country during these years there were isolated social crisis. However, when it was the case then the most noticeable awareness was reflected in the attacks on convents and churches, such as the convent of "La Milagrosa" and the Parish of Blanca's church "San Juan Evangelista". As a result of this violence, Blanca missed a significant number of religious art, especially in religious imagery (saved from the same attacks one of the most prestigious and appreciated image of the "Christ tied to the column" of a Salzillo style and authorship of Sanchez Tapia).

Despite remaining at the side of the Republic, the region of Murcia remained far from the front lines because there was little military action, except sporadic bombing ports of Cartagena and Águilas. In March 1939, the national side's troops occupied the city along with the rest of the region. From a demographic standpoint, the twentieth century has been a time of stagnation for Blanca. A century earlier it had 6,000 inhabitants, which same figure remains in the twenty-first century. Today, immigration is essential to maintain and increase this number. This is not surprising because the economy of the municipality at the beginning of the century was based on agriculture, esparto (10) and the sale of timber, what gradually disappeared with the advent of synthetic fibers. These circumstances and the closure of cannery industries and the abandonment of logging forced the emigration of many local residents to other places. Only agriculture, currently devoted to fruit and grapes, received a significant boost with the waters of the Tajo-Segura. However, Blanca's inhabitants do not surrender to adversity and fight together to face future times in a remarkable effort to develop their city.

== Sights ==
- Church St. John the Evangelist of the eighteenth century
- Moorish Castle of the twelfth century
- Peña Negra (volcanic black rock on which the city sits)
- Blanca Museum and Art Center (MUCAB) International architectural landmark
- Pedro Cano's Foundation
- Centro Negra, space for research and contemporary creation (AADK)
- Interpretation Centre of Water and Light
- Hermitage of Saint Roch (Baroque)
- Holy Family Chapel
- Hermitage of San Pedro
- Church "Virgen del Pilar"
- Ferris Wheel "Núñez Miguelico"
- Craftsman House Workshop "Center Negra". In a prime location on the outskirts of the Moorish castle; there are courses in painting, art...
- Country house "La Favorita"
- Walkways along the river.

== Economy ==
- Industrial Estate "San Roque"
- Industrial Estate "Ángel Prieto Oliva"

== Festivities and important Events ==
Easter Festivities: As in other places in the region, when Lent comes all the religious groups (cofradías) and brotherhoods to bring passion finalize preparations for the acts and parades full of fervor and passion. At present, there are eight religious groups in Blanca, of which the oldest ones are:

- The Royal and Most Illustrious Brotherhood of Our Father Jesus of Nazareth,
- The Brotherhood of St. John the Evangelist,
- The Royal Congregation of the Sacred Hearts of Jesus and Mary
- The Brotherhood of Servitas of Our Lady of the Virgin of Sorrows.

Other religious groups of a later date are:

- The Brotherhood of Veronica,
- The Brotherhood of San Pedro,
- The Brotherhood of St Mary Magdalene

and the younger Brotherhood:

- The Brotherhood of the Agony in the Garden

The Brotherhood of the Agony in the Garden carried the image of the Virgin of Sorrows to the Good Friday procession in 1986, and this was three years later after the foundations of this brotherhood. It is worth mentioning, the traditional Bid of Images that shows the emotion of the Blanca's inhabitants to pay for carrying on their shoulders the chosen image.

Summer Festivities: Blanca celebrates its summer festivities in August in honor of their patron saint, Saint Roch, marked with changes in decorations and the making of the sweet bread (la mona). The running of the bulls festival in particular is the most celebrated day in Blanca, with the festival being a declared Regional Tourist Interest. On the mornings of the event, a festive atmosphere precedes the running route, featuring music, dancing, and marching bands that perform throughout the streets. The tradition is a unique event in the Region of Murcia and has been held for well over 350 years, and is always celebrated before 15 August. The life and traditions of the city are well described by another chronicler of the village, Ángel Ríos Martínez (11-25).

Spring Festivities: Blanca in Spring - after the Semana Santa - begins with a week of festivities dedicated to the patron of Saint Roche. The most characteristics of these festivities are the Coronation of the Queen and the Pilgrimage. The pilgrimage is to return the patron of the municipality from the church located in the center of the city to his own hermitage dedicated to this patron. People will bring the patron after one day to the place where he was received with jubilation and skyrockets.

== Twin towns ==
- Anguillara Sabazia, Italy

Twinning is an act that takes place "between two people, two cultures, with the aim of bringing, joining customs, relationships, feelings ...." This could well be a definition of twinning, "gemellaggio" in Italian. In these lines Irene Molina explained years ago, in 1999, which were her impressions in the face of event occurred between Blanca and the Italian brother Anguillara Sabazia.

In the late 20th century, Blanca had the idea of twinning a distant Italian town Italian located about thirty miles from Rome, called Anguillara Sabazia. This village was a similar to Blanca as to its structure, its climate, its importance of water and a landscape represented by a lake in Anguillara (Bracciano) and the river (Segura) in the municipality of Blanca. In the last month of August, 1998 twinning began between Anguillara and Blanca, with the arrival of a representation of "anguilarillos" to Blanca. A representation of fifty-five inhabitants of Blanca traveled on 4 May 1998 to Italy for visiting Anguillara and for consolidating the twinning.

== See also ==
- List of municipalities in the Region of Murcia
