= Liberal Democratic Centre =

Defunct political party in Spain

Liberal Democratic Centre Centro Democrático Liberal
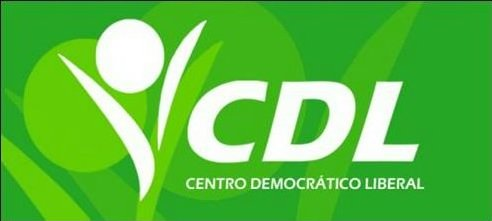
- President: Sean O´Curneen Cañas
- Secretary-General: Alfonso Reina
- Founder: Víctor Manuel Sarto Lorén
- Founded: 14 February 2006
- Dissolved: 24 February 2014
- Split from: Democratic and Social Centre
- Merged into: Citizens
- Headquarters: Madrid, Spain
- Ideology: Liberalism
- Political position: Centre
- Slogan: Abriendo caminos a personas

The Liberal Democratic Centre (Spanish: Centro Democrático Liberal, CDL) was a liberal political party in Spain.

It was launched in February 2006 and was led by Manuel Alonso, a former leading member of the Union of the Democratic Centre (UCD) and the Democratic and Social Centre (CDS). The party was closely linked with the British Liberal Democrats and became a full member of the European Liberal Democrat and Reform Party. It became an observer on 17 April 2009.

In February 2014, almost 88% of the members voted to merge the party with Citizens – Party of the Citizenry.

== Leadership ==
- President: Víctor Manuel Sarto Lorén (2006–2008), Manuel Alonso (2008–2009)
- President: Sean O´Curneen Cañas (2009–2014)
