= United Left–Greens of the Region of Murcia =

United Left–Greens of the Region of Murcia Izquierda Unida–Verdes de la Región de Murcia
- General Coordinators: José Luis Álvarez-Castellanos; Candi Marín
- Founded: 1986
- Merger of: Communist Party of the Region of Murcia; Communist Youth of Murcia; Ecosocialists of the Region of Murcia; Independents
- Headquarters: Paseo Fotógrafo Verdú, 5, Murcia
- Ideology: Ecosocialism; Communism; Republicanism; Feminism; Federalism
- Political position: Left-wing
- National affiliation: United Left
- Union affiliation: CCOO
- Regional Assembly of Murcia: 0 / 45
- Congress of Deputies: 0 / 10 (Murcian seats)
- Senate: 0 / 6 (Murcian seats)
- Local seats: 57 / 763

Website
- iuverdes.es

United Left–Greens of the Region of Murcia (Spanish: Izquierda Unida–Verdes de la Región de Murcia. IU–V–RM) is the Murcian federation of the Spanish left wing political and social movement United Left. José Luis Álvarez-Castellanos and Candi Marín are the current General Coordinators. The major member of the coalition is the Communist Party of the Region of Murcia (PCRM, Murcian federation of the Communist Party of Spain).

== Electoral performance ==
=== Regional Assembly of Murcia ===
Regional Assembly of Murcia
Election	Votes	%	Seats	+/–	Leading candidate	Government
1987	37,708	7.45 (#4)	1 / 45	0 (Note: Compared to the Communist Party of the Region of Murcia totals in the 1983 regional election.)	Pedro Antonio Ríos	Opposition
1991	52,863	10.21 (#3)	4 / 45	3	Pedro Antonio Ríos	Opposition
1995	78,875	12.46 (#3)	4 / 45	0	Antonio Joaquín Dólera	Opposition
1999	42,839	7.00 (#3)	1 / 45	3	Antonio Joaquín Dólera	Opposition
2003	36,754	5.66 (#3)	1 / 45	0	Cayetano Jaime Moltó	Opposition
2007	40,633	6.25 (#3)	1 / 45	0	José Antonio Pujante	Opposition
2011	50,988	7.83 (#3)	1 / 45	0	José Antonio Pujante	Opposition
2015	Within Ganar		0 / 45	1	José Antonio Pujante	No seats
2019	13,252 (Note: Within Change the Region of Murcia coalition)	2.02 (#8)	0 / 45	0	José Luis Álvarez-Castellanos	No seats
2023	Within Podemos– IU–AV		0 / 45	0	María Marín	No seats

== See also ==
- United Left (Spain)
- Communist Party of the Region of Murcia
