= Building the Left–Socialist Alternative =

Building the Left–Socialist Alternative Construyendo la Izquierda–Alternativa Socialista
- Abbreviation: CLI–AS, AS
- President: Enrique del Rey Mazón
- General secretary: Carlos Martínez y Odalys Padrón
- Founded: 2013
- Dissolved: 2018
- Ideology: Socialism; Republicanism; Federalism; Ecologism; Feminism; Eco-socialism
- Political position: Left-wing
- National affiliation: Popular Unity (2015–2016); Unidas Podemos (2016–2018)

Website
- cli-as.org

Building the Left–Socialist Alternative (Spanish: Construyendo la Izquierda–Alternativa Socialista, CLI–AS), also known as Socialist Alternative (Spanish: Alternativa Socialista, AS), was a left-wing political party in Spain. The party was founded in 2013 by members of the PSOE critical with the neoliberal positions of the party, along with independents and people from the 15-M Movement. It was dissolved in 2018.

== History ==
CLI–AS supported the Plural Left in the European Parliament election of 2014, Popular Unity for the Spanish elections of 2015 and Unidos Podemos for the Spanish elections of 2016.
