= Podemos Region of Murcia =

- General Secretary: Javier Sánchez Serna
- Founded: 17 January 2014
- Headquarters: C/ Cartagena, 84 Bajo 30002 Murcia
- Ideology: Left-wing populism
- Political position: Left-wing
- Colours: Purple
- Regional Assembly of Murcia: 2 / 45
- Congreso de los Diputados (Murcian seats): 1 / 10

Website
- rmurcia.podemos.info

Podemos Region of Murcia is a branch of Podemos in the Region of Murcia, Spain.

In July 2014, the fourth assembly of the Murcian branch was held, with the objective of joining all the Podemos groups of the region into the party. After primaries process ended on 14 February 2015, the first Citizen Regional Council was elected. Óscar Urralburu Arza was elected the secretary general.

In the 2015 Murcian parliamentary election, Murcia Podemos won six seats, forming a parliamentary group in Regional Assembly of Murcia.

For the first time, no party has an absolute majority and the People's Party (Spain) now depend on Citizens (Spanish political party) to form a government despite a prior agreement with Podemos and other parties in which C's agreed not to support the PP.

== Electoral performance ==
=== Regional Assembly of Murcia ===
Date	Votes			Seats		Status	Size
Date	#	%	±pp	#	±	Status	Size
2015	84,577	13.2%	+13.2	6 / 45	6	Opposition	3rd
2019	36,486	5.6%	-7.6	2 / 45	4	Opposition	5th
2023	32,173	4.7%	-2.9	2 / 45	0	Opposition	4th

=== Cortes Generales ===
Congress of Deputies
Date	Votes			Seats		Size
Date	#	%	±pp	#	±	Size
2015	110,601	15.2%	+15.2	1 / 10	1	4th
2016	103,522	14.5%	N/A	1 / 10	0	*
2019 (Apr)	79,650	10.4%	N/A	1 / 10	0	*
2019 (Nov)	62,897	8.8%	N/A	1 / 10	0	*

Senate
Date	Seats		Size
Date	#	±	Size
2015	0 / 4	0	4th
2016	0 / 4	0	*
2019 (Apr)	0 / 4	0	*
2019 (Nov)	0 / 4	0	*

- * Within Unidos Podemos.

=== European Parliament ===
Date	Votes			Size
Date	#	%	±pp	Size
2014	32,428	7.6%	+7.6	5th
2019	51,316	8.0%	N/A	*

- * Within Unidas Podemos Cambiar Europa.

== Symbols ==
Logo from July 2014 to May 2020.
