= Results of the 2023 Spanish Congress election =

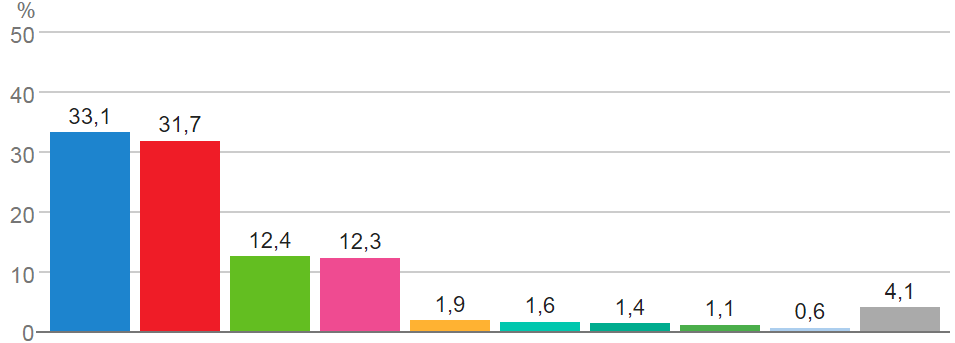
(Spain)	Main: 2023 Spanish general election
← 2019 (Nov) 23 July 2023 Next →
Party		Votes	%	Seats
	PP	8,160,837	33.1%	137
	PSOE	7,821,718	31.7%	121
	Vox	3,057,000	12.4%	33
	Sumar	3,044,996	12.3%	31
	ERC	466,020	1.9%	7
	Junts	395,429	1.6%	7
	EH Bildu	335,129	1.4%	6
	EAJ/PNV	277,289	1.1%	5
	BNG	153,995	0.6%	1
	Others	975,674	4.0%	2
Total		24,688,087	100.0%	350

This article presents the results breakdown of the election to the Congress of Deputies held in Spain on 23 July 2023. The following tables show detailed results in each of the country's 17 autonomous communities and in the autonomous cities of Ceuta and Melilla, as well as a summary of constituency and regional results.

== Nationwide ==
← Summary of the 23 July 2023 Congress of Deputies election results
Parties and alliances	Popular vote			Seats	
Parties and alliances	Votes	%	±pp	Total	+/−
People's Party (PP)	8,160,837	33.06	+12.25	137	+48
Spanish Socialist Workers' Party (PSOE)	7,821,718	31.68	+3.68	121	+1
Vox (Vox)	3,057,000	12.38	−2.70	33	−19
Unite (Sumar)^{1}	3,044,996	12.33	−3.01	31	−7
Republican Left of Catalonia (ERC)	466,020	1.89	−1.74	7	−6
Together for Catalonia (Junts)^{2}	395,429	1.60	n/a	7	+3
Basque Country Gather (EH Bildu)	335,129	1.36	+0.22	6	+1
Basque Nationalist Party (EAJ/PNV)	277,289	1.12	−0.44	5	−1
Animalist Party with the Environment (PACMA)^{3}	169,237	0.69	−0.25	0	±0
Galician Nationalist Bloc (BNG)	153,995	0.62	+0.12	1	±0
Canarian Coalition (CCa)^{4}	116,363	0.47	n/a	1	±0
Popular Unity Candidacy–For Rupture (CUP–PR)	99,644	0.40	−0.62	0	−2
Navarrese People's Union (UPN)^{5}	52,188	0.21	n/a	1	−1
Workers' Front (FO)	46,274	0.19	New	0	±0
New Canaries–Canarian Bloc (NC–BC)^{4}	45,595	0.18	n/a	0	−1
Empty Spain (España Vaciada)	36,793	0.15	+0.07	0	−1
Aragon Exists–Exists Coalition (Existe)^{6}	20,440	0.08	±0.00	0	−1
Soria Now! (SY)	9,697	0.04	New	0	±0
Empty Spain (España Vaciada)	5,472	0.02	New	0	±0
Empty Spain–Castilian Party–Commoners' Land (EV–PCAS–TC)	1,184	0.00	New	0	±0
Catalan European Democratic Party–CiU Space (PDeCAT–E–CiU)^{2}	32,016	0.13	n/a	0	−4
Zero Cuts (Recortes Cero)	23,421	0.09	−0.05	0	±0
For a Fairer World (PUM+J)	23,290	0.09	−0.02	0	±0
Leonese People's Union (UPL)	23,201	0.09	+0.05	0	±0
Communist Party of the Workers of Spain (PCTE)	18,218	0.07	+0.02	0	±0
Yes to the Future (GBai)	9,938	0.04	−0.01	0	±0
Forward Andalusia (Adelante Andalucía)	9,191	0.04	New	0	±0
Blank Seats to Leave Empty Seats (EB)	8,448	0.03	+0.01	0	±0
Jaén Deserves More (JM+)	8,293	0.03	New	0	±0
For Ávila (XAV)	7,362	0.03	+0.01	0	±0
Extremaduran Bloc (BQEx)	5,807	0.02	New	0	±0
Walking Together (CJ)	5,620	0.02	New	0	±0
Spanish Phalanx of the CNSO (FE de las JONS)	4,683	0.02	+0.02	0	±0
Aragonese Party (PAR)	4,173	0.02	New	0	±0
Humanist Party (PH)	2,902	0.01	±0.00	0	±0
For Huelva (XH)	1,931	0.01	New	0	±0
Let's Go Palencia (VP)	1,917	0.01	New	0	±0
Zamora Yes (ZSí)	1,843	0.01	New	0	±0
Burgalese Way (VB)	1,774	0.01	New	0	±0
For My Region (Por Mi Región)^{7}	1,698	0.01	±0.00	0	±0
Canaries Now–Communist Party of the Canarian People (ANC–UP–PCPC)^{8}	1,674	0.01	±0.00	0	±0
Self-employed Party (Partido Autónomos)	1,446	0.01	New	0	±0
Valencian Welfare State (EVB)	1,442	0.01	New	0	±0
Coalition for Melilla (CpM)	1,298	0.01	−0.03	0	±0
Together for Granada (JxG)	1,218	0.00	New	0	±0
Regionalist Party of the Leonese Country (PREPAL)	964	0.00	±0.00	0	±0
We Are Cáceres (Somos Cc)	963	0.00	New	0	±0
People from Almería–Regionalists for Almería (ALM)	874	0.00	New	0	±0
Federation of Independents of Aragon (FIA)	506	0.00	±0.00	0	±0
Seniors in Action (3e)	484	0.00	New	0	±0
Castilian Unity (UdCa)	463	0.00	New	0	±0
Alive Land Palencia Independent Group (GIPTV)	366	0.00	New	0	±0
State of Spain Unionist Party (PUEDE)	269	0.00	New	0	±0
Catalonia Among Neighbors (EVR)	265	0.00	New	0	±0
Free (LB)	263	0.00	New	0	±0
United Yes (Unidos SI)	253	0.00	±0.00	0	±0
System Money Referendum (+RDS+)	165	0.00	New	0	±0
Citizens of Democratic Centre (CCD)	153	0.00	New	0	±0
Civic Force (Fuerza Cívica)	115	0.00	New	0	±0
Citizens–Party of the Citizenry (Cs)	n/a	n/a	−6.80	0	−10
Regionalist Party of Cantabria (PRC)	n/a	n/a	−0.28	0	−1
Blank ballots	200,673	0.81	−0.09		
Total	24,688,087			350	±0
Valid votes	24,688,087	98.94	−0.04		
Invalid votes	264,360	1.06	+0.04		
Votes cast / turnout	24,952,447	66.59	+0.36		
Abstentions	12,517,011	33.41	−0.36		
Registered voters	37,469,458				
Sources
Footnotes: ^{1} Unite results are compared to the combined totals of United We Can, More Country, More Left and Aragonese Union in the November 2019 election.; ^{2} Within the Together for Catalonia–Together alliance in the November 2019 election.; ^{3} Animalist Party with the Environment results are compared to Animalist Party Against Mistreatment of Animals totals in the November 2019 election.; ^{4} Within the Canarian Coalition–New Canaries alliance in the November 2019 election.; ^{5} Within the Sum Navarre alliance in the November 2019 election.; ^{6} Aragon Exists–Exists Coalition results are compared to Teruel Exists totals in the November 2019 election.; ^{7} For My Region results are compared to We Are Region totals in the November 2019 election.; ^{8} Canaries Now–Communist Party of the Canarian People results are compared to the combined totals of Canaries Now and Communist Party of the Canarian People in the November 2019 election.

== Summary ==
=== Constituencies ===

Summary of constituency results in the 23 July 2023 Congress of Deputies election
Constituency	PP		PSOE		Vox		Sumar		ERC		Junts		EH Bildu		PNV		BNG		CCa		UPN	
Constituency	%	S	%	S	%	S	%	S	%	S	%	S	%	S	%	S	%	S	%	S	%	S
A Coruña	43.1	4	28.2	2	5.1	−	12.2	1									10.0	1				
Álava	17.9	1	27.7	1	3.9	−	12.7	−					19.5	1	16.6	1						
Albacete	39.9	2	34.5	2	16.6	−	7.2	−														
Alicante	36.7	5	32.0	4	16.3	2	12.9	1														
Almería	41.0	3	29.0	2	21.4	1	6.6	−														
Asturias	35.6	3	34.3	2	12.5	1	14.8	1														
Ávila	43.3	2	27.4	1	15.4	−	5.1	−														
Badajoz	37.8	2	39.2	2	13.7	1	6.8	−														
Balearic Islands	35.6	3	30.2	3	15.2	1	16.6	1														
Barcelona	13.8	5	35.7	13	7.6	2	15.2	5	12.3	4	9.7	3										
Biscay	11.5	1	25.8	2	2.6	−	10.9	1					20.7	2	27.0	2						
Burgos	40.6	2	34.4	2	12.8	−	8.6	−														
Cáceres	38.1	2	38.9	2	13.6	−	6.9	−														
Cádiz	34.8	4	33.2	3	15.2	1	12.9	1														
Cantabria	42.1	2	33.3	2	14.1	1	8.5	−														
Castellón	35.2	2	32.6	2	15.9	1	14.3	−														
Ceuta	38.8	1	34.0	−	23.3	−	2.5	−														
Ciudad Real	40.5	2	35.4	2	16.3	1	6.2	−														
Córdoba	37.9	2	32.1	2	13.9	1	13.7	1														
Cuenca	39.8	2	37.4	1	15.6	−	5.6	−														
Gipuzkoa	8.7	−	23.3	2	2.1	−	10.6	−					31.2	2	22.6	2						
Girona	9.7	−	28.9	2	7.0	−	10.9	1	14.7	1	19.6	2										
Granada	37.0	3	33.0	2	16.1	1	11.6	1														
Guadalajara	36.3	1	33.0	1	19.3	1	9.2	−														
Huelva	36.4	2	36.0	2	14.6	1	10.4	−														
Huesca	38.2	2	33.6	1	12.6	−	11.5	−														
Jaén	37.3	2	36.3	2	14.8	1	8.0	−														
La Rioja	45.6	2	35.7	2	9.8	−	6.6	−														
Las Palmas	25.9	3	33.2	3	14.6	1	10.3	1											6.3	−		
León	36.9	2	33.6	2	12.9	−	6.7	−														
Lleida	12.8	−	29.5	2	6.8	−	7.9	−	18.6	1	18.0	1										
Lugo	50.2	3	30.3	1	4.4	−	5.2	−									8.7	−				
Madrid	40.5	16	27.8	10	14.0	5	15.5	6														
Málaga	38.3	5	30.3	3	16.5	2	12.3	1														
Melilla	49.2	1	25.4	−	15.9	−	3.0	−														
Murcia	41.2	4	25.3	3	21.8	2	9.6	1														
Navarre	16.7	1	27.4	2	5.7	−	12.8	−					17.2	1							15.3	1
Ourense	50.0	3	30.1	1	4.9	−	5.5	−									8.2	−				
Palencia	42.0	2	34.7	1	12.9	−	6.1	−														
Pontevedra	39.6	3	31.4	3	4.7	−	13.2	1									9.4	−				
Salamanca	47.0	3	30.4	1	14.7	−	5.5	−														
Santa Cruz de Tenerife	35.4	3	33.5	3			10.8	−											16.7	1		
Segovia	45.0	2	30.6	1	14.1	−	8.1	−														
Seville	33.4	4	36.6	5	13.3	1	14.0	2														
Soria	37.2	1	29.5	1	9.8	−	3.4	−														
Tarragona	13.9	1	32.9	2	10.3	−	11.3	1	15.1	1	11.1	1										
Teruel	35.0	2	29.3	1	13.1	−	5.4	−														
Toledo	37.8	3	32.6	2	19.6	1	8.2	−														
Valencia	33.6	6	32.1	5	15.2	2	16.9	3														
Valladolid	40.8	2	32.8	2	15.2	1	8.9	−														
Zamora	44.8	2	32.5	1	13.2	−	5.6	−														
Zaragoza	36.0	3	30.8	2	15.3	1	13.5	1														
Total	33.1	137	31.7	121	12.4	33	12.3	31	1.9	7	1.6	7	1.4	6	1.1	5	0.6	1	0.5	1	0.2	1

=== Regions ===

Summary of regional results in the 23 July 2023 Congress of Deputies election
Region	PP		PSOE		Vox		Sumar		ERC		Junts		EH Bildu		PNV		BNG		CCa		UPN	
Region	%	S	%	S	%	S	%	S	%	S	%	S	%	S	%	S	%	S	%	S	%	S
Andalusia	36.4	25	33.5	21	15.3	9	12.0	6														
Aragon	36.3	7	31.1	4	14.6	1	12.3	1														
Asturias	35.6	3	34.3	2	12.5	1	14.8	1														
Balearic Islands	35.6	3	30.2	3	15.2	1	16.6	1														
Basque Country	11.6	2	25.3	5	2.6	−	11.1	1					23.9	5	24.0	5						
Canary Islands	30.4	6	33.3	6	7.6	1	10.5	1											11.4	1		
Cantabria	42.1	2	33.3	2	14.1	1	8.5	−														
Castile and León	41.5	18	32.3	12	13.8	1	7.0	−														
Castilla–La Mancha	38.9	10	34.2	8	17.8	3	7.4	−														
Catalonia	13.4	6	34.5	19	7.8	2	14.0	7	13.2	7	11.2	7										
Ceuta	38.8	1	34.0	−	23.3	−	2.5	−														
Extremadura	37.9	4	39.1	4	13.6	1	6.9	−														
Galicia	43.6	13	29.8	7	4.9	−	10.9	2									9.4	1				
La Rioja	45.6	2	35.7	2	9.8	−	6.6	−														
Madrid	40.5	16	27.8	10	14.0	5	15.5	6														
Melilla	49.2	1	25.4	−	15.9	−	3.0	−														
Murcia	41.2	4	25.3	3	21.8	2	9.6	1														
Navarre	16.7	1	27.4	2	5.7	−	12.8	−					17.2	1							15.3	1
Valencian Community	34.9	13	32.1	11	15.6	5	15.2	4														
Total	33.1	137	31.7	121	12.4	33	12.3	31	1.9	7	1.6	7	1.4	6	1.1	5	0.6	1	0.5	1	0.2	1

== Autonomous communities ==
=== Andalusia ===
← Summary of the 23 July 2023 Congress of Deputies election results in Andalusia →
Parties and alliances	Popular vote			Seats	
Parties and alliances	Votes	%	±pp	Total	+/−
People's Party (PP)	1,596,044	36.41	+15.87	25	+10
Spanish Socialist Workers' Party (PSOE)	1,467,501	33.48	+0.12	21	−4
Vox (Vox)	671,507	15.32	−5.04	9	−3
Unite Andalusia (Sumar)^{1}	525,371	11.99	−2.43	6	±0
Animalist Party with the Environment (PACMA)^{2}	34,850	0.80	−0.31	0	±0
Forward Andalusia (Adelante Andalucía)	9,191	0.21	New	0	±0
Jaén Deserves More (JM+)	8,293	0.19	New	0	±0
Workers' Front (FO)	7,106	0.16	New	0	±0
For a Fairer World (PUM+J)	6,419	0.15	+0.03	0	±0
Zero Cuts (Recortes Cero)	3,769	0.09	−0.05	0	±0
Communist Party of the Workers of Spain (PCTE)	2,963	0.07	+0.02	0	±0
Walking Together (CJ)	2,809	0.06	New	0	±0
For Huelva (XH)	1,931	0.04	New	0	±0
Together for Granada (JxG)	1,218	0.03	New	0	±0
Blank Seats to Leave Empty Seats (EB)	942	0.02	−0.01	0	±0
People from Almería–Regionalists for Almería (ALM)	874	0.02	New	0	±0
Spanish Phalanx of the CNSO (FE de las JONS)	681	0.02	New	0	±0
Free (LB)	210	0.00	New	0	±0
Citizens–Party of the Citizenry (Cs)	n/a	n/a	−8.10	0	−3
Blank ballots	41,339	0.94	−0.25		
Total	4,383,018			61	±0
Valid votes	4,383,018	98.66	+0.16		
Invalid votes	59,446	1.34	−0.16		
Votes cast / turnout	4,442,464	66.61	+0.70		
Abstentions	2,227,177	33.39	−0.70		
Registered voters	6,669,641				
Sources
Footnotes: ^{1} Unite Andalusia results are compared to the combined totals of United We Can and More Country–Andalusia in the November 2019 election.; ^{2} Animalist Party with the Environment results are compared to Animalist Party Against Mistreatment of Animals totals in the November 2019 election.

=== Aragon ===
← Summary of the 23 July 2023 Congress of Deputies election results in Aragon →
Parties and alliances	Popular vote			Seats	
Parties and alliances	Votes	%	±pp	Total	+/−
People's Party (PP)	259,145	36.27	+12.41	7	+3
Spanish Socialist Workers' Party (PSOE)	222,391	31.12	+0.40	4	−2
Vox (Vox)	104,463	14.62	−2.35	1	±0
Unite Aragon (Sumar Aragón)^{1}	87,825	12.29	−2.14	1	±0
Aragon Exists–Exists Coalition (Existe)^{2}	20,440	2.86	+0.04	0	−1
Aragonese Party (PAR)	4,173	0.58	New	0	±0
Animalist Party with the Environment (PACMA)^{3}	3,098	0.43	−0.22	0	±0
Blank Seats to Leave Empty Seats (EB)	2,756	0.39	+0.06	0	±0
Workers' Front (FO)	1,378	0.19	New	0	±0
Communist Party of the Workers of Spain (PCTE)	758	0.11	+0.04	0	±0
For a Fairer World (PUM+J)	569	0.08	−0.02	0	±0
Federation of Independents of Aragon (FIA)	506	0.07	±0.00	0	±0
Zero Cuts (Recortes Cero)	419	0.06	−0.09	0	±0
Spanish Phalanx of the CNSO (FE de las JONS)	272	0.04	New	0	±0
Blank ballots	6,320	0.88	−0.08		
Total	714,513			13	±0
Valid votes	714,513	99.08	−0.06		
Invalid votes	6,606	0.92	+0.06		
Votes cast / turnout	721,119	70.71	+1.37		
Abstentions	298,684	29.29	−1.37		
Registered voters	1,019,803				
Sources
Footnotes: ^{1} Unite Aragon results are compared to the combined totals of United We Can, More Country–Aragonese Union–Equo and Aragonese Union in the November 2019 election.; ^{2} Aragon Exists–Exists Coalition results are compared to Teruel Exists totals in the November 2019 election.; ^{3} Animalist Party with the Environment results are compared to Animalist Party Against Mistreatment of Animals totals in the November 2019 election.

=== Asturias ===
← Summary of the 23 July 2023 Congress of Deputies election results in Asturias →
Parties and alliances	Popular vote			Seats	
Parties and alliances	Votes	%	±pp	Total	+/−
People's Party (PP)	212,816	35.65	+12.43	3	+1
Spanish Socialist Workers' Party (PSOE)	205,049	34.34	+1.07	2	−1
Unite (Sumar)^{1}	88,630	14.85	−3.37	1	±0
Vox (Vox)	74,571	12.49	−3.37	1	±0
Animalist Party with the Environment (PACMA)^{2}	3,167	0.53	−0.26	0	±0
Asturias Exists–Empty Spain (Asturias Existe EV)	2,314	0.39	New	0	±0
Communist Party of the Workers of Spain (PCTE)	1,598	0.27	+0.12	0	±0
Workers' Front (FO)	1,176	0.20	New	0	±0
For a Fairer World (PUM+J)	773	0.13	+0.04	0	±0
Zero Cuts (Recortes Cero)	590	0.10	−0.03	0	±0
State of Spain Unionist Party (PUEDE)	269	0.05	New	0	±0
Blank ballots	6,079	1.02	−0.24		
Total	597,032			7	±0
Valid votes	597,032	98.98	−0.05		
Invalid votes	6,151	1.02	+0.05		
Votes cast / turnout	603,183	62.90	+4.78		
Abstentions	355,840	37.10	−4.78		
Registered voters	959,023				
Sources
Footnotes: ^{1} Unite results are compared to the combined totals of United We Can and More Country–Equo in the November 2019 election.; ^{2} Animalist Party with the Environment results are compared to Animalist Party Against Mistreatment of Animals totals in the November 2019 election.

=== Balearic Islands ===
← Summary of the 23 July 2023 Congress of Deputies election results in the Balearic Islands →
Parties and alliances	Popular vote			Seats	
Parties and alliances	Votes	%	±pp	Total	+/−
People's Party (PP)	179,303	35.63	+12.79	3	+1
Socialist Party of the Balearic Islands (PSIB–PSOE)	151,786	30.16	+4.72	3	+1
More for Mallorca–More for Menorca–Unite (Més–MxMe–Sumar)^{1}	83,487	16.59	−7.89	1	−1
Vox (Vox)	76,547	15.21	−1.86	1	−1
Animalist Party with the Environment (PACMA)^{2}	4,969	0.99	−0.38	0	±0
Workers' Front (FO)	1,039	0.21	New	0	±0
Zero Cuts (Recortes Cero)	726	0.14	−0.07	0	±0
Communist Party of the Workers of Spain (PCTE)	719	0.14	New	0	±0
Blank ballots	4,704	0.93	−0.10		
Total	503,280			8	±0
Valid votes	503,280	99.03	−0.01		
Invalid votes	4,953	0.97	+0.01		
Votes cast / turnout	508,233	61.32	+4.51		
Abstentions	320,522	38.68	−4.51		
Registered voters	828,755				
Sources
Footnotes: ^{1} More for Mallorca–More for Menorca–Unite results are compared to the combined totals of United We Can, More Left and More Country in the November 2019 election.; ^{2} Animalist Party with the Environment results are compared to Animalist Party Against Mistreatment of Animals totals in the November 2019 election.

=== Basque Country ===
← Summary of the 23 July 2023 Congress of Deputies election results in the Basque Country →
Parties and alliances	Popular vote			Seats	
Parties and alliances	Votes	%	±pp	Total	+/−
Socialist Party of the Basque Country–Basque Country Left (PSE–EE (PSOE))	291,932	25.27	+6.06	5	+1
Basque Nationalist Party (EAJ/PNV)	277,289	24.00	−8.01	5	−1
Basque Country Gather (EH Bildu)	276,175	23.90	+5.23	5	+1
People's Party (PP)	133,466	11.55	+2.70	2	+1
Unite (Sumar)^{1}	128,234	11.10	−5.05	1	−2
Vox (Vox)	30,519	2.64	+0.19	0	±0
Animalist Party with the Environment (PACMA)^{2}	5,070	0.44	−0.15	0	±0
Workers' Front (FO)	1,813	0.16	New	0	±0
Blank Seats to Leave Empty Seats (EB)	1,552	0.13	+0.08	0	±0
Zero Cuts (Recortes Cero)	1,152	0.10	−0.04	0	±0
For a Fairer World (PUM+J)	1,059	0.09	−0.01	0	±0
Communist Party of the Workers of the Basque Country (PCTE/ELAK)	1,042	0.09	+0.01	0	±0
Blank ballots	6,118	0.53	−0.03		
Total	1,155,421			18	±0
Valid votes	1,155,421	99.22	−0.22		
Invalid votes	9,026	0.78	+0.22		
Votes cast / turnout	1,164,447	65.09	−1.34		
Abstentions	624,623	34.91	+1.34		
Registered voters	1,789,070				
Sources
Footnotes: ^{1} Unite results are compared to the combined totals of United We Can and More Country–Ecologist Candidacy in the November 2019 election.; ^{2} Animalist Party with the Environment results are compared to Animalist Party Against Mistreatment of Animals totals in the November 2019 election.

=== Canary Islands ===
← Summary of the 23 July 2023 Congress of Deputies election results in the Canary Islands →
Parties and alliances	Popular vote			Seats	
Parties and alliances	Votes	%	±pp	Total	+/−
Spanish Socialist Workers' Party (PSOE)	341,261	33.34	+4.46	6	+1
People's Party (PP)	311,627	30.44	+9.67	6	+2
Canarian Coalition (CCa)^{1}	116,363	11.37	n/a	1	±0
Unite Canaries (Sumar Canarias)^{2}	108,001	10.55	−5.73	1	−1
Vox (Vox)	77,343	7.56	−4.89	1	−1
New Canaries–Canarian Bloc (NC–BC)^{1}	45,595	4.45	n/a	0	−1
Animalist Party with the Environment (PACMA)^{3}	9,717	0.95	−0.31	0	±0
Workers' Front (FO)	2,254	0.22	New	0	±0
Canaries Now–Communist Party of the Canarian People (ANC–UP–PCPC)^{4}	1,674	0.16	−0.18	0	±0
Zero Cuts (Recortes Cero)	1,162	0.11	+0.01	0	±0
For a Fairer World (PUM+J)	563	0.05	−0.04	0	±0
Blank ballots	8,150	0.80	+0.02		
Total	1,023,710			15	±0
Valid votes	1,023,710	98.84	−0.13		
Invalid votes	11,979	1.16	+0.13		
Votes cast / turnout	1,035,689	58.18	+2.74		
Abstentions	744,410	41.82	−2.74		
Registered voters	1,780,099				
Sources
Footnotes: ^{1} Within the Canarian Coalition–New Canaries alliance in the November 2019 election.; ^{2} Unite Canaries results are compared to the combined totals of United We Can and More Country–Equo in the November 2019 election.; ^{3} Animalist Party with the Environment results are compared to Animalist Party Against Mistreatment of Animals totals in the November 2019 election.; ^{4} Canaries Now–Communist Party of the Canarian People results are compared to the combined totals of Canaries Now and Communist Party of the Canarian People in the November 2019 election.

=== Cantabria ===
← Summary of the 23 July 2023 Congress of Deputies election results in Cantabria →
Parties and alliances	Popular vote			Seats	
Parties and alliances	Votes	%	±pp	Total	+/−
People's Party (PP)	147,326	42.08	+16.22	2	±0
Spanish Socialist Workers' Party (PSOE)	116,596	33.30	+10.06	2	+1
Vox (Vox)	49,243	14.06	−0.87	1	±0
Unite (Sumar)^{1}	29,713	8.49	−0.19	0	±0
Animalist Party with the Environment (PACMA)^{2}	2,089	0.60	+0.03	0	±0
Workers' Front (FO)	790	0.23	New	0	±0
Communist Party of the Workers of Spain (PCTE)	598	0.17	+0.09	0	±0
Zero Cuts (Recortes Cero)	533	0.15	+0.08	0	±0
Regionalist Party of Cantabria (PRC)	n/a	n/a	−21.04	0	−1
Blank ballots	3,262	0.93	+0.42		
Total	350,150			5	±0
Valid votes	350,150	98.59	−0.58		
Invalid votes	4,995	1.41	+0.58		
Votes cast / turnout	355,145	69.94	+4.20		
Abstentions	152,673	30.06	−4.20		
Registered voters	507,818				
Sources
Footnotes: ^{1} Unite results are compared to United We Can totals in the November 2019 election.; ^{2} Animalist Party with the Environment results are compared to Animalist Party Against Mistreatment of Animals totals in the November 2019 election.

=== Castile and León ===
← Summary of the 23 July 2023 Congress of Deputies election results in Castile and León →
Parties and alliances	Popular vote			Seats	
Parties and alliances	Votes	%	±pp	Total	+/−
People's Party (PP)	594,485	41.55	+9.94	18	+5
Spanish Socialist Workers' Party (PSOE)	462,788	32.34	+1.07	12	±0
Vox (Vox)	197,172	13.78	−2.83	1	−5
Unite (Sumar)^{1}	100,737	7.04	−2.30	0	±0
Leonese People's Union (UPL)	23,201	1.62	+0.88	0	±0
Empty Spain (España Vaciada)	14,039	0.98	New	0	±0
Soria Now! (SY)	9,697	0.68	New	0	±0
Empty Spain (España Vaciada)	3,158	0.22	New	0	±0
Empty Spain–Castilian Party–Commoners' Land (EV–PCAS–TC)	1,184	0.08	New	0	±0
For Ávila (XAV)	7,362	0.51	+0.12	0	±0
Animalist Party with the Environment (PACMA)^{2}	4,858	0.34	−0.24	0	±0
Workers' Front (FO)	2,521	0.18	New	0	±0
Let's Go Palencia (VP)	1,917	0.13	New	0	±0
Zamora Yes (ZSí)	1,843	0.13	New	0	±0
Burgalese Way (VB)	1,774	0.12	New	0	±0
Communist Party of the Workers of Spain (PCTE)	1,730	0.12	−0.01	0	±0
For a Fairer World (PUM+J)	1,520	0.11	−0.07	0	±0
Regionalist Party of the Leonese Country (PREPAL)	964	0.07	±0.00	0	±0
Zero Cuts (Recortes Cero)	672	0.05	−0.13	0	±0
Blank Seats to Leave Empty Seats (EB)	583	0.04	New	0	±0
Castilian Unity (UdCa)	463	0.03	New	0	±0
Alive Land Palencia Independent Group (GIPTV)	366	0.03	New	0	±0
Spanish Phalanx of the CNSO (FE de las JONS)	312	0.02	±0.00	0	±0
Walking Together (CJ)	275	0.02	New	0	±0
Seniors in Action (3e)	198	0.01	New	0	±0
Civic Force (Fuerza Cívica)	115	0.01	New	0	±0
Blank ballots	11,043	0.77	−0.32		
Total	1,430,938			31	±0
Valid votes	1,430,938	98.94	+0.21		
Invalid votes	15,377	1.06	−0.21		
Votes cast / turnout	1,446,315	69.41	+2.80		
Abstentions	637,421	30.59	−2.80		
Registered voters	2,083,736				
Sources
Footnotes: ^{1} Unite results are compared to United We Can totals in the November 2019 election.; ^{2} Animalist Party with the Environment results are compared to Animalist Party Against Mistreatment of Animals totals in the November 2019 election.

=== Castilla–La Mancha ===
← Summary of the 23 July 2023 Congress of Deputies election results in Castilla–La Mancha →
Parties and alliances	Popular vote			Seats	
Parties and alliances	Votes	%	±pp	Total	+/−
People's Party (PP)	445,991	38.91	+12.04	10	+3
Spanish Socialist Workers' Party (PSOE)	391,503	34.16	+1.06	8	−1
Vox (Vox)	203,666	17.77	−4.13	3	−2
Unite (Sumar)^{1}	84,347	7.36	−1.86	0	±0
Animalist Party with the Environment (PACMA)^{2}	6,030	0.53	−0.20	0	±0
Workers' Front (FO)	2,324	0.20	New	0	±0
For a Fairer World (PUM+J)	1,549	0.14	−0.04	0	±0
Zero Cuts (Recortes Cero)	913	0.08	−0.07	0	±0
Spanish Phalanx of the CNSO (FE de las JONS)	399	0.03	+0.01	0	±0
Communist Party of the Workers of Spain (PCTE)	291	0.03	−0.02	0	±0
Blank Seats to Leave Empty Seats (EB)	168	0.01	New	0	±0
Blank ballots	8,910	0.78	−0.05		
Total	1,146,091			21	±0
Valid votes	1,146,091	98.65	−0.02		
Invalid votes	15,733	1.35	+0.02		
Votes cast / turnout	1,161,824	72.99	+2.93		
Abstentions	429,903	27.01	−2.93		
Registered voters	1,591,727				
Sources
Footnotes: ^{1} Unite results are compared to United We Can totals in the November 2019 election.; ^{2} Animalist Party with the Environment results are compared to Animalist Party Against Mistreatment of Animals totals in the November 2019 election.

=== Catalonia ===
← Summary of the 23 July 2023 Congress of Deputies election results in Catalonia →
Parties and alliances	Popular vote			Seats	
Parties and alliances	Votes	%	±pp	Total	+/−
Socialists' Party of Catalonia (PSC–PSOE)	1,221,335	34.47	+13.97	19	+7
Unite–In Common We Can (Sumar–ECP)^{1}	497,617	14.04	−0.13	7	±0
People's Party (PP)	473,620	13.37	+5.95	6	+4
Republican Left of Catalonia (ERC)	466,020	13.15	−9.42	7	−6
Together for Catalonia (Junts)^{2}	395,429	11.16	n/a	7	+3
Vox (Vox)	275,080	7.76	+1.47	2	±0
Popular Unity Candidacy–For Rupture (CUP–PR)	99,644	2.81	−3.56	0	−2
Animalist Party with the Environment (PACMA)^{3}	36,881	1.04	−0.11	0	±0
Catalan European Democratic Party–CiU Space (PDeCAT–E–CiU)^{2}	32,016	0.90	n/a	0	−4
Workers' Front (FO)	7,526	0.21	New	0	±0
Communist Party of the Workers of Catalonia (PCTC)	3,875	0.11	+0.05	0	±0
Zero Cuts (Recortes Cero)	3,739	0.11	−0.04	0	±0
Blank Seats to Leave Empty Seats (EB)	462	0.01	New	0	±0
Catalonia Among Neighbors (EVR)	265	0.01	New	0	±0
United Yes (Unidos SI)	253	0.01	New	0	±0
Citizens–Party of the Citizenry (Cs)	n/a	n/a	−5.62	0	−2
Blank ballots	29,267	0.83	+0.13		
Total	3,543,029			48	±0
Valid votes	3,543,029	99.10	−0.37		
Invalid votes	32,205	0.90	+0.37		
Votes cast / turnout	3,575,234	62.68	−6.72		
Abstentions	2,128,550	37.32	+6.72		
Registered voters	5,703,784				
Sources
Footnotes: ^{1} Unite–In Common We Can results are compared to the combined totals of In Common We Can–Let's Win the Change and More Country in the November 2019 election.; ^{2} Within the Together for Catalonia–Together alliance in the November 2019 election.; ^{3} Animalist Party with the Environment results are compared to Animalist Party Against Mistreatment of Animals totals in the November 2019 election.

=== Extremadura ===
← Summary of the 23 July 2023 Congress of Deputies election results in Extremadura →
Parties and alliances	Popular vote			Seats	
Parties and alliances	Votes	%	±pp	Total	+/−
Spanish Socialist Workers' Party (PSOE)	245,165	39.08	+0.75	4	−1
People's Party (PP)	237,701	37.89	+11.89	4	+1
Vox (Vox)	85,568	13.64	−3.18	1	−1
Unite (Sumar)^{1}	43,132	6.88	−2.23	0	±0
Extremaduran Bloc (BQEx)	5,807	0.93	New	0	±0
Animalist Party with the Environment (PACMA)^{2}	2,209	0.35	−0.27	0	±0
We Are Cáceres (Somos Cc)	963	0.15	New	0	±0
Workers' Front (FO)	793	0.13	New	0	±0
For a Fairer World (PUM+J)	713	0.11	−0.10	0	±0
Zero Cuts (Recortes Cero)	315	0.05	−0.12	0	±0
Blank ballots	4,946	0.79	−0.14		
Total	627,312			9	−1
Valid votes	627,312	98.33	+0.17		
Invalid votes	10,668	1.67	−0.17		
Votes cast / turnout	637,980	71.67	+4.45		
Abstentions	252,213	28.33	−4.45		
Registered voters	890,193				
Sources
Footnotes: ^{1} Unite results are compared to United We Can totals in the November 2019 election.; ^{2} Animalist Party with the Environment results are compared to Animalist Party Against Mistreatment of Animals totals in the November 2019 election.

=== Galicia ===
← Summary of the 23 July 2023 Congress of Deputies election results in Galicia →
Parties and alliances	Popular vote			Seats	
Parties and alliances	Votes	%	±pp	Total	+/−
People's Party (PP)	712,881	43.58	+11.65	13	+3
Socialists' Party of Galicia (PSdeG–PSOE)	486,832	29.76	−1.49	7	−3
Unite Galicia (Sumar)^{1}	178,691	10.92	−3.26	2	±0
Galician Nationalist Bloc (BNG)	153,995	9.41	+1.32	1	±0
Vox (Vox)	79,672	4.87	−2.95	0	±0
Animalist Party with the Environment (PACMA)^{2}	7,444	0.46	−0.31	0	±0
Workers' Front (FO)	2,310	0.14	New	0	±0
Zero Cuts (Recortes Cero)	1,268	0.08	−0.07	0	±0
Communist Party of the Workers of Galicia (PCTG)	702	0.04	−0.04	0	±0
For a Fairer World (PUM+J)	293	0.02	−0.09	0	±0
Citizens of Democratic Centre (CCD)	153	0.01	New	0	±0
Blank ballots	11,422	0.70	−0.39		
Total	1,635,663			23	±0
Valid votes	1,635,663	99.07	+0.35		
Invalid votes	15,423	0.93	−0.35		
Votes cast / turnout	1,651,086	61.41	+5.55		
Abstentions	1,037,541	38.59	−5.55		
Registered voters	2,688,627				
Sources
Footnotes: ^{1} Unite Galicia results are compared to the combined totals of In Common–United We Can and More Country–Equo in the November 2019 election.; ^{2} Animalist Party with the Environment results are compared to Animalist Party Against Mistreatment of Animals totals in the November 2019 election.

=== La Rioja ===
← Summary of the 23 July 2023 Congress of Deputies election results in La Rioja →
Parties and alliances	Popular vote			Seats	
Parties and alliances	Votes	%	±pp	Total	+/−
People's Party (PP)	79,715	45.64	+11.41	2	±0
Spanish Socialist Workers' Party (PSOE)	62,322	35.68	+0.83	2	±0
Vox (Vox)	17,056	9.77	−1.69	0	±0
Unite (Sumar)^{1}	11,470	6.57	−3.30	0	±0
Animalist Party with the Environment (PACMA)^{2}	723	0.41	−0.25	0	±0
Blank Seats to Leave Empty Seats (EB)	608	0.35	+0.09	0	±0
Workers' Front (FO)	295	0.17	New	0	±0
Seniors in Action (3e)	286	0.16	New	0	±0
For a Fairer World (PUM+J)	232	0.13	−0.05	0	±0
Communist Party of the Workers of Spain (PCTE)	224	0.13	−0.03	0	±0
Zero Cuts (Recortes Cero)	124	0.07	−0.12	0	±0
Blank ballots	1,608	0.92	−0.15		
Total	174,663			4	±0
Valid votes	174,663	98.71	+0.27		
Invalid votes	2,282	1.29	−0.27		
Votes cast / turnout	176,945	70.19	+3.23		
Abstentions	75,146	29.81	−3.23		
Registered voters	252,091				
Sources
Footnotes: ^{1} Unite results are compared to United We Can totals in the November 2019 election.; ^{2} Animalist Party with the Environment results are compared to Animalist Party Against Mistreatment of Animals totals in the November 2019 election.

=== Madrid ===
← Summary of the 23 July 2023 Congress of Deputies election results in Madrid →
Parties and alliances	Popular vote			Seats	
Parties and alliances	Votes	%	±pp	Total	+/−
People's Party (PP)	1,463,183	40.55	+15.64	16	+6
Spanish Socialist Workers' Party (PSOE)	1,004,599	27.84	+0.97	10	±0
Unite (Sumar)^{1}	557,780	15.46	−3.20	6	−1
Vox (Vox)	506,164	14.03	−4.31	5	−2
Animalist Party with the Environment (PACMA)^{2}	21,742	0.60	−0.30	0	±0
Workers' Front (FO)	7,652	0.21	New	0	±0
For a Fairer World (PUM+J)	6,749	0.19	+0.07	0	±0
Zero Cuts (Recortes Cero)	3,784	0.10	−0.04	0	±0
Communist Party of the Workers of Spain (PCTE)	3,407	0.09	+0.04	0	±0
Humanist Party (PH)	2,902	0.08	+0.01	0	±0
Spanish Phalanx of the CNSO (FE de las JONS)	1,751	0.05	New	0	±0
Citizens–Party of the Citizenry (Cs)	n/a	n/a	−9.07	0	−3
Blank ballots	28,960	0.80	−0.01		
Total	3,608,673			37	±0
Valid votes	3,608,673	99.15	−0.06		
Invalid votes	30,827	0.85	+0.06		
Votes cast / turnout	3,639,500	69.66	−0.93		
Abstentions	1,585,061	30.34	+0.93		
Registered voters	5,224,561				
Sources
Footnotes: ^{1} Unite results are compared to the combined totals of United We Can and More Country–Equo in the November 2019 election.; ^{2} Animalist Party with the Environment results are compared to Animalist Party Against Mistreatment of Animals totals in the November 2019 election.

=== Murcia ===
← Summary of the 23 July 2023 Congress of Deputies election results in Murcia →
Parties and alliances	Popular vote			Seats	
Parties and alliances	Votes	%	±pp	Total	+/−
People's Party (PP)	307,972	41.18	+14.67	4	+1
Spanish Socialist Workers' Party (PSOE)	189,210	25.30	+0.52	3	±0
Vox (Vox)	163,124	21.81	−6.14	2	−1
Unite (Sumar)^{1}	71,578	9.57	−1.19	1	±0
Animalist Party with the Environment (PACMA)^{2}	5,063	0.68	−0.30	0	±0
For My Region (Por Mi Región)^{3}	1,698	0.23	−0.10	0	±0
Blank Seats to Leave Empty Seats (EB)	1,377	0.18	New	0	±0
Workers' Front (FO)	1,201	0.16	New	0	±0
Zero Cuts (Recortes Cero)	546	0.07	−0.05	0	±0
Walking Together (CJ)	453	0.06	New	0	±0
Spanish Phalanx of the CNSO (FE de las JONS)	376	0.05	New	0	±0
System Money Referendum (+RDS+)	165	0.02	New	0	±0
Blank ballots	5,034	0.67	−0.06		
Total	747,797			10	±0
Valid votes	747,797	99.01	+0.04		
Invalid votes	7,458	0.99	−0.04		
Votes cast / turnout	755,255	68.68	+0.65		
Abstentions	344,448	31.32	−0.65		
Registered voters	1,099,703				
Sources
Footnotes: ^{1} Unite results are compared to the combined totals of United We Can and More Country–Equo in the November 2019 election.; ^{2} Animalist Party with the Environment results are compared to Animalist Party Against Mistreatment of Animals totals in the November 2019 election.; ^{3} For My Region results are compared to We Are Region totals in the November 2019 election.

=== Navarre ===
← Summary of the 23 July 2023 Congress of Deputies election results in Navarre →
Parties and alliances	Popular vote			Seats	
Parties and alliances	Votes	%	±pp	Total	+/−
Socialist Party of Navarre (PSN–PSOE)	93,553	27.37	+2.37	2	+1
Basque Country Gather (EH Bildu)	58,954	17.25	+0.37	1	±0
People's Party (PP)^{1}	57,134	16.71	n/a	1	+1
Navarrese People's Union (UPN)^{1}	52,188	15.27	n/a	1	−1
Unite (Sumar)^{2}	43,922	12.85	−3.71	0	−1
Vox (Vox)	19,491	5.70	−0.10	0	±0
Yes to the Future (GBai)	9,938	2.91	−0.88	0	±0
Animalist Party with the Environment (PACMA)^{3}	1,530	0.45	−0.22	0	±0
For a Fairer World (PUM+J)	1,002	0.29	+0.01	0	±0
Workers' Front (FO)	679	0.20	New	0	±0
Communist Party of the Workers of Spain (PCTE)	311	0.09	−0.02	0	±0
Zero Cuts (Recortes Cero)	252	0.07	−0.22	0	±0
Blank ballots	2,890	0.85	−0.18		
Total	341,844			5	±0
Valid votes	341,844	99.06	−0.05		
Invalid votes	3,251	0.94	+0.05		
Votes cast / turnout	345,095	66.37	+0.46		
Abstentions	174,823	33.63	−0.46		
Registered voters	519,918				
Sources
Footnotes: ^{1} Within the Sum Navarre alliance in the November 2019 election.; ^{2} Unite results are compared to United We Can totals in the November 2019 election.; ^{3} Animalist Party with the Environment results are compared to Animalist Party Against Mistreatment of Animals totals in the November 2019 election.

=== Valencian Community ===
← Summary of the 23 July 2023 Congress of Deputies election results in the Valencian Community →
Parties and alliances	Popular vote			Seats	
Parties and alliances	Votes	%	±pp	Total	+/−
People's Party (PP)	922,064	34.87	+11.83	13	+5
Spanish Socialist Workers' Party (PSOE)	849,620	32.13	+4.53	11	+1
Vox (Vox)	413,703	15.65	−2.81	5	−2
Commitment–Unite: We Unite to Win (Sumar–Compromís)^{1}	402,813	15.23	−5.11	4	−1
Animalist Party with the Environment (PACMA)^{2}	19,637	0.74	−0.34	0	±0
Workers' Front (FO)	5,364	0.20	New	0	±0
Zero Cuts (Recortes Cero)	3,401	0.13	+0.02	0	±0
Walking Together (CJ)	2,083	0.08	New	0	±0
For a Fairer World (PUM+J)	1,778	0.07	−0.02	0	±0
Self-employed Party (Partido Autónomos)	1,446	0.05	New	0	±0
Valencian Welfare State (EVB)	1,442	0.05	New	0	±0
Spanish Phalanx of the CNSO (FE de las JONS)	892	0.03	+0.02	0	±0
Citizens–Party of the Citizenry (Cs)	n/a	n/a	−7.74	0	−2
Blank ballots	20,040	0.76	−0.02		
Total	2,644,283			33	+1
Valid votes	2,644,283	98.98	−0.10		
Invalid votes	27,327	1.02	+0.10		
Votes cast / turnout	2,671,610	71.50	+1.70		
Abstentions	1,064,871	28.50	−1.70		
Registered voters	3,736,481				
Sources
Footnotes: ^{1} Commitment–Unite: We Unite to Win results are compared to the combined totals of United We Can and More Commitment in the November 2019 election.; ^{2} Animalist Party with the Environment results are compared to Animalist Party Against Mistreatment of Animals totals in the November 2019 election.

== Autonomous cities ==
=== Ceuta ===
← Summary of the 23 July 2023 Congress of Deputies election results in Ceuta →
Parties and alliances	Popular vote			Seats	
Parties and alliances	Votes	%	±pp	Total	+/−
People's Party (PP)	12,918	38.77	+16.49	1	+1
Spanish Socialist Workers' Party (PSOE)	11,332	34.01	+2.70	0	±0
Vox (Vox)	7,752	23.26	−11.93	0	−1
Unite (Sumar)^{1}	821	2.46	−1.43	0	±0
Workers' Front (FO)	53	0.16	New	0	±0
Free (LB)	53	0.16	New	0	±0
Zero Cuts (Recortes Cero)	33	0.10	−0.27	0	±0
For a Fairer World (PUM+J)	31	0.09	−0.04	0	±0
Blank ballots	328	0.98	+0.01		
Total	33,321			1	±0
Valid votes	33,321	98.95	−0.01		
Invalid votes	353	1.05	+0.01		
Votes cast / turnout	33,674	53.19	−0.79		
Abstentions	29,636	46.81	+0.79		
Registered voters	63,310				
Sources
Footnotes: ^{1} Unite results are compared to United We Can totals in the November 2019 election.

=== Melilla ===
← Summary of the 23 July 2023 Congress of Deputies election results in Melilla →
Parties and alliances	Popular vote			Seats	
Parties and alliances	Votes	%	±pp	Total	+/−
People's Party (PP)	13,446	49.16	+19.62	1	±0
Spanish Socialist Workers' Party (PSOE)	6,943	25.39	+8.94	0	±0
Vox (Vox)	4,359	15.94	−2.46	0	±0
Coalition for Melilla (CpM)	1,298	4.75	−24.20	0	±0
Unite (Sumar)^{1}	827	3.02	+0.40	0	±0
Animalist Party with the Environment (PACMA)	160	0.59	New	0	±0
For a Fairer World (PUM+J)	40	0.15	+0.05	0	±0
Zero Cuts (Recortes Cero)	23	0.08	+0.02	0	±0
Blank ballots	253	0.93	+0.33		
Total	27,349			1	±0
Valid votes	27,349	98.91	−0.32		
Invalid votes	300	1.09	+0.32		
Votes cast / turnout	27,649	45.24	−7.15		
Abstentions	33,469	54.76	+7.15		
Registered voters	61,118				
Sources
Footnotes: ^{1} Unite results are compared to United We Can totals in the November 2019 election.
