= Opinion polling for the 2023 Spanish local elections (Region of Murcia) =

In the run up to the 2023 Spanish local elections, various organisations carried out opinion polling to gauge voting intention in local entities in Spain. Results of such polls for municipalities in the Region of Murcia are displayed in this article. The date range for these opinion polls is from the previous local elections, held on 26 May 2019, to the day the next elections were held, on 28 May 2023.

Polls are listed in reverse chronological order, showing the most recent first and using the dates when the survey fieldwork was done, as opposed to the date of publication. Where the fieldwork dates are unknown, the date of publication is given instead. The highest percentage figure in each polling survey is displayed with its background shaded in the leading party's colour. If a tie ensues, this is applied to the figures with the highest percentages. The "Lead" columns on the right shows the percentage-point difference between the parties with the highest percentages in a given poll.

== Municipalities ==
=== Abanilla ===
Polling firm/Commissioner	Fieldwork date	Sample size	Turnout	PSOE	PP	IUMA	Lead
2023 municipal election	28 May 2023	—N/a	77.5	42.5; 6	46.5; 7	4.9; 0	4.0
Murcia Electoral	2–9 Jun 2020	115	?	50.5; 7	42.6; 5	6.4; 1	7.9
2019 municipal election	26 May 2019	—N/a	76.3	47.5; 6	44.7; 6	7.4; 1	2.8

=== Alguazas ===
Polling firm/Commissioner	Fieldwork date	Sample size	Turnout	PSOE	PP	UxA	Vox	CS	IU–V–RM	Lead
2023 municipal election	28 May 2023	—N/a	66.5	26.6; 4	25.0; 3	39.3; 5	8.2; 1	–	–	12.7
Murcia Electoral	2–9 Jun 2020	152	?	41.5; 6	27.5; 4	16.4; 2	10.9; 1	1.4; 0	1.8; 0	14.0
2019 municipal election	26 May 2019	—N/a	68.7	39.8; 6	30.9; 5	18.4; 2	5.7; 0	2.8; 0	1.8; 0	8.9

=== Cartagena ===
Polling firm/Commissioner	Fieldwork date	Sample size	Turnout	MCC	PP	PSOE	CS	Vox	Unidas Podemos	xMR	SíC	Lead
2023 municipal election	28 May 2023	—N/a	60.1	25.7; 8	34.3; 10	13.2; 4	1.1; 0	12.6; 4	4.0; 0	0.1; 0	5.4; 1	8.6
Celeste-Tel/Sí Cartagena	2–11 May 2023	800	?	? 6	30.0; 9	17.5; 4	? 0	? 3	? 0	–	? 5	?
GAD3/Vocento	26–27 Apr 2023	550	?	28.3; 8	30.1; 9	13.2; 4	1.7; 0	13.3; 4	5.5; 1	–	5.1; 1	1.8
Sigma Dos/La Verdad	20–28 Sep 2022	600	?	25.5; 7/8	27.4; 8/9	19.3; 6	3.6; 0	10.4; 3	8.0; 2	–	–	1.9
EM-Analytics/Electomanía	13 May–6 Aug 2021	304	?	29.8; 9	29.9; 9	21.1; 6	2.9; 0	9.5; 3	4.8; 0	–	–	0.1
Murcia Electoral	29 Jul–16 Aug 2020	357	?	30.1; 9	23.6; 7	19.6; 5	6.0; 1	10.0; 3	7.1; 2	1.3; 0	–	6.5
Murcia Electoral	2–9 Jun 2020	272	?	29.6; 9	23.4; 7	18.7; 5	5.0; 1	10.4; 3	8.3; 2	1.4; 0	–	6.2
2019 municipal election	26 May 2019	—N/a	57.1	27.4; 8	25.5; 7	21.7; 6	8.2; 2	8.0; 2	6.9; 2	1.1; 0	–	1.9

=== Cieza ===
Polling firm/Commissioner	Fieldwork date	Sample size	Turnout	PSOE	PP	IU–V–RM	CS	Vox	Podemos	Lead
2023 municipal election	28 May 2023	—N/a	60.2	39.4; 9	35.7; 9	4.8; 0	3.1; 0	12.3; 3	2.1; 0	3.7
Celeste-Tel/Latalaya	2–12 Jan 2023	400	?	39.9; 10	30.9; 7	11.2; 2	2.7; 0	8.2; 2	–	9.0
2019 municipal election	26 May 2019	—N/a	57.2	41.2; 10	23.2; 5	8.4; 2	7.9; 2	7.8; 2	4.1; 0	18.0

=== Lorca ===
Polling firm/Commissioner	Fieldwork date	Sample size	Turnout	PP	PSOE	IU–V–RM	Vox	CS	Podemos	CL	xMR	Unidas Podemos	Lead
2023 municipal election	28 May 2023	—N/a	66.2	40.9; 11	33.5; 9	(Note: Within Unidas Podemos.)	17.1; 4	0.8; 0		–	–	5.3; 1	7.4
Murcia Electoral	29 Jul–16 Aug 2020	183	?	37.3; 11	34.7; 10	8.6; 2	9.8; 2	4.6; 0	1.6; 0	1.4; 0	1.3; 0	–	2.6
Murcia Electoral	2–9 Jun 2020	212	?	35.0; 9	36.1; 10	8.4; 2	10.9; 3	5.0; 1	2.0; 0	1.1; 0	1.1; 0	–	1.1
2019 municipal election	26 May 2019	—N/a	63.8	37.4; 10	36.1; 10	7.6; 2	7.5; 2	5.4; 1	2.8; 0	1.6; 0	1.0; 0	–	1.3

=== Molina de Segura ===
Polling firm/Commissioner	Fieldwork date	Sample size	Turnout	PSOE	PP	CS	Vox	Podemos	IU–V–RM	xMR	Lead
2023 municipal election	28 May 2023	—N/a	64.2	38.4; 11	32.4; 9	1.1; 0	17.5; 5	1.8; 0	2.7; 0	0.4; 0	6.0
Murcia Electoral	2–9 Jun 2020	232	?	37.1; 11	29.3; 8	12.0; 3	12.2; 3	3.6; 0	2.1; 0	1.0; 0	7.8
2019 municipal election	26 May 2019	—N/a	63.0	43.0; 12	27.4; 7	11.4; 3	8.8; 2	5.0; 1	1.9; 0	0.7; 0	15.6

=== Murcia ===
Polling firm/Commissioner	Fieldwork date	Sample size	Turnout	PP	PSOE	CS	Vox	Podemos	CM	xMR	PACMA	Más País	Unidas Podemos	Lead
2023 municipal election	28 May 2023	—N/a	66.1	45.4; 15	24.3; 8	1.7; 0	18.8; 6			0.4; 0	–	1.8; 0	4.5; 0	16.3
GAD3/Vocento	26–27 Apr 2023	400	?	42.7; 14	26.4; 8	0.8; 0	18.9; 5/6			–	–	–	5.8; 1/2	16.3
Sigma Dos/El Mundo	2–10 Jan 2023	332	?	42.7; 14	27.0; 8/9	3.3; 0	15.5; 5			–	–	–	5.8; 1/2	15.7
InvyMark	12–18 Dec 2022	600	?	38.0; 12/13	27.7; 8/9	2.0; 0	22.0; 7			–	–	–	5.8; 1	10.3
Sigma Dos/La Verdad	20–28 Sep 2022	600	?	43.8; 13/14	30.2; 10/11	2.5; 0	13.3; 4			–	–	–	6.9; 2	13.6
InvyMark	27 Jun–6 Jul 2022	1,500	?	35.2; 10/11	30.1; 9/10	3.0; 0	21.1; 7/8			–	–	–	5.7; 1/2	5.1
EM-Analytics/Electomanía	14 Mar 2021	600	?	40.8; 13	35.0; 12	3.0; 0	11.4; 3	5.6; 1	–	–	–	–	–	5.8
Sigma Dos/La Verdad	10–12 Mar 2021	600	?	41.8; 13/14	28.8; 9/10	3.7; 0/1	18.7; 5	4.8; 0/1	–	–	–	–	–	13.0
Murcia Electoral	2–9 Jun 2020	270	?	32.6; 10	27.4; 9	10.3; 3	14.9; 5	7.4; 2	1.0; 0	1.9; 0	0.8; 0	2.7; 0	–	5.2
2019 municipal election	26 May 2019	—N/a	64.6	34.9; 11	28.9; 9	13.5; 4	10.2; 3	6.4; 2	2.2; 0	2.0; 0	0.8; 0	–	–	6.0

=== Puerto Lumbreras ===
Polling firm/Commissioner	Fieldwork date	Sample size	Turnout	PP	PSOE	IU–V–RM	Vox	CS	Podemos	xMR	Lead
2023 municipal election	28 May 2023	—N/a	72.2	40.3; 8	42.4; 8	4.2; 0	8.6; 1	–	–	–	2.1
Murcia Electoral	29 Jul–16 Aug 2020	148	?	38.0; 7	39.6; 8	7.6; 1	7.8; 1	–	–	–	1.6
2019 municipal election	26 May 2019	—N/a	72.1	40.0; 8	39.5; 7	7.1; 1	5.6; 1	3.4; 0	3.0; 0	0.8; 0	0.5

=== San Javier ===
Polling firm/Commissioner	Fieldwork date	Sample size	Turnout	PP	PSOE	CS	Vox	Unidas Podemos	PL	xMR	Lead
2023 municipal election	28 May 2023	—N/a	58.7	49.5; 11	16.9; 4	2.5; 0	15.6; 3	5.4; 1	8.9; 2	–	32.6
Murcia Electoral	29 Jul–16 Aug 2020	183	?	51.2; 13	20.5; 5	4.6; 0	8.8; 2	6.6; 1	4.0; 0	2.4; 0	30.7
2019 municipal election	26 May 2019	—N/a	60.6	45.4; 11	21.9; 5	9.5; 2	7.8; 2	6.9; 1	4.1; 0	3.9; 0	23.5

=== Yecla ===
Polling firm/Commissioner	Fieldwork date	Sample size	Turnout	PP	PSOE	IU–V–RM	CS	Vox	Lead
2023 municipal election	28 May 2023	—N/a	67.9	43.6; 9	30.9; 7	9.1; 2	–	14.9; 3	12.7
Murcia Electoral	2–9 Jun 2020	156	?	44.0; 10	21.6; 4	13.6; 3	5.6; 1	14.4; 3	22.4
2019 municipal election	26 May 2019	—N/a	71.0	53.1; 12	25.7; 5	10.9; 2	9.4; 2	–	27.4
