= 2003 Spanish local elections in the Region of Murcia =

This article presents the results breakdown of the local elections held in the Region of Murcia on 25 May 2003. The following tables show detailed results in the autonomous community's most populous municipalities, sorted alphabetically.

== City control ==
The following table lists party control in the most populous municipalities, including provincial capitals (highlighted in bold). Gains for a party are highlighted in that party's colour.

Municipality	Population	Previous control	New control
Cartagena	188,003	People's Party (PP)	People's Party (PP)
Lorca	79,481	Spanish Socialist Workers' Party (PSOE)	Spanish Socialist Workers' Party (PSOE)
**Murcia**	377,888	People's Party (PP)	People's Party (PP)

== Municipalities ==
=== Cartagena ===
Population: 188,003

← Summary of the 25 May 2003 City Council of Cartagena election results →
Parties and alliances	Popular vote			Seats	
Parties and alliances	Votes	%	±pp	Total	+/−
People's Party (PP)	48,159	55.70	+5.10	**16**	−1
Spanish Socialist Workers' Party (PSOE)	25,842	29.89	+1.06	**9**	±0
Citizens' Movement of Cartagena (MCC)^{1}	4,507	5.21	−1.79	**1**	+1
United Left of the Region of Murcia (IURM)	4,439	5.13	−0.51	**1**	±0
The Greens (LV)	1,826	2.11	+0.77	0	±0
Citizens' Convergence of the South-East (CCSE)	489	0.57	New	0	±0
Blank ballots	1,207	1.40	−0.09		
**Total**	**86,469**			**27**	**±0**
Valid votes	86,469	99.17	−0.18		
Invalid votes	726	0.83	+0.18		
**Votes cast / turnout**	**87,195**	**59.27**	**+3.71**		
Abstentions	59,908	40.73	−3.71		
**Registered voters**	**147,103**				
Sources
Footnotes: ^{1} Citizens' Movement of Cartagena results are compared to the combined totals of Coalition for Cartagena. Convergence–Cantonal Party and Minor Sea Independent Party–Neighbourhood Indep. Movement in the 1999 election.

=== Lorca ===
Population: 79,481

← Summary of the 25 May 2003 City Council of Lorca election results →
Parties and alliances	Popular vote			Seats	
Parties and alliances	Votes	%	±pp	Total	+/−
Spanish Socialist Workers' Party (PSOE)	20,731	54.84	−9.61	**14**	−3
People's Party (PP)	13,607	36.00	+7.14	**9**	+1
United Left of the Region of Murcia (IURM)	3,004	7.95	+3.25	**2**	+2
Blank ballots	458	1.21	+0.18		
**Total**	**37,800**			**25**	**±0**
Valid votes	37,800	99.15	−0.15		
Invalid votes	323	0.85	+0.15		
**Votes cast / turnout**	**38,123**	**63.46**	**−5.11**		
Abstentions	21,948	36.54	+5.11		
**Registered voters**	**60,071**				

=== Murcia ===
Population: 377,888

← Summary of the 25 May 2003 City Council of Murcia election results →
Parties and alliances	Popular vote			Seats	
Parties and alliances	Votes	%	±pp	Total	+/−
People's Party (PP)	121,684	60.06	+2.38	**19**	+1
Spanish Socialist Workers' Party (PSOE)	62,033	30.62	−0.58	**10**	+1
United Left of the Region of Murcia (IURM)	10,004	4.94	−2.28	0	−2
The Greens (LV)	4,937	2.44	New	0	±0
Blank ballots	3,961	1.95	+0.08		
**Total**	**202,619**			**29**	**±0**
Valid votes	202,619	99.47	+0.03		
Invalid votes	1,084	0.53	−0.03		
**Votes cast / turnout**	**203,703**	**69.39**	**+3.45**		
Abstentions	89,851	30.61	−3.45		
**Registered voters**	**293,554**				

== See also ==
- 2003 Murcian regional election
