= Murcia (Congress of Deputies constituency) =

Electoral constituency in Spain

Coordinates: 38°00′N 1°50′W

- Congress of Deputies; Electoral constituency
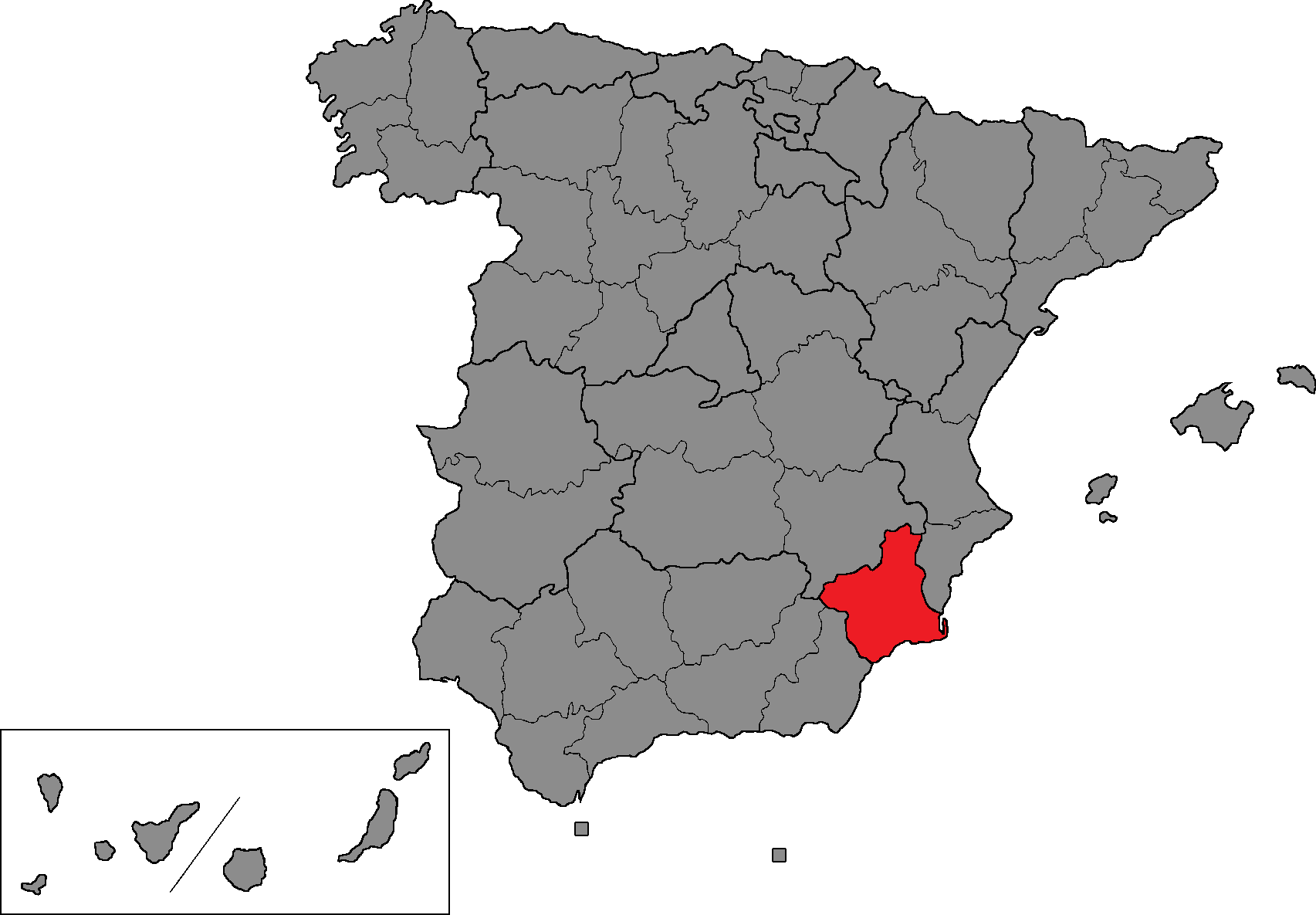
- Location of Murcia within Spain
- Province: Murcia
- Autonomous community: Region of Murcia
- Population: ▲1,571,933 (2024)
- Electorate: ▲1,099,703 (2023)
- Major settlements: Murcia, Cartagena, Lorca, Molina de Segura

Current constituency
- Created: 1977
- Seats: 8 (1977–1989); 9 (1989–2008); 10 (2008–present)
- Members: PP (4); PSOE (3); Vox (2); Podemos (1)

Murcia is one of the 52 constituencies represented in the Congress of Deputies, the lower chamber of the Spanish parliament, the Cortes Generales. The constituency (whose boundaries correspond to those of the homonymous province) currently elects 10 deputies. The electoral system uses the D'Hondt method and closed-list proportional voting, with a minimum threshold of three percent.

== Electoral system ==
The constituency was created as per the Political Reform Law and was first contested in the 1977 general election. The Law provided for the provinces of Spain to be established as multi-member districts in the Congress of Deputies, with this regulation being maintained under the Spanish Constitution of 1978. Additionally, the Constitution requires for any modification of the provincial limits to be approved under an organic law, needing an absolute majority in the Cortes Generales.

Voting is based on universal suffrage, comprising all Spanish nationals over 18 years of age with full political rights, provided that they have not been deprived of the right to vote by a final sentence. The only exception was in 1977, when this was limited to nationals over 21 years of age and in full enjoyment of their political and civil rights. Amendments in 2011 required non-resident citizens to apply for voting, a system known as "begged" voting (Spanish: Voto rogado). which was abolished in 2022. Further, amendments in 2018 granted the right to vote to those legally incapacitated. The Congress of Deputies has a minimum of 300 and a maximum of 400 seats, with electoral provisions fixing its size at 350. Of these, 348 are elected in 50 multi-member constituencies corresponding to the provinces of Spain—each of which is assigned an initial minimum of two seats and the remaining 248 distributed in proportion to population—using the D'Hondt method and closed-list proportional voting, with a three percent-threshold of valid votes (including blank ballots) in each constituency. The remaining two seats are allocated to Ceuta and Melilla as single-member districts elected by plurality voting. The use of this electoral method may result in a higher effective threshold depending on district magnitude and vote distribution. The law does not provide for by-elections to fill vacant seats; instead, any vacancies arising after the proclamation of candidates and during the legislative term are filled by the next candidates on the party lists or, when required, by designated substitutes.

The electoral law allows for parties and federations registered in the interior ministry, alliances and groupings of electors to present lists of candidates. Parties and federations intending to form an alliance are required to inform the relevant electoral commission within 10 days of the election call—15 before 1985—whereas groupings of electors need to secure the signature of at least one percent of the electorate in the constituencies for which they seek election—one permille of the electorate, with a compulsory minimum of 500 signatures, until 1985—disallowing electors from signing for more than one list. Also since 2011, parties, federations or alliances that have not obtained a mandate in either chamber of the Cortes at the preceding election are required to secure the signature of at least 0.1 percent of electors in the aforementioned constituencies. Amendments in 2007 required a balanced composition of men and women in the electoral lists, so that candidates of either sex made up at least 40 percent of the total composition; further amendments in 2024 required the use of a zipper system.

== Deputies ==
Deputies 1977–present
Key to parties IU U.Podemos Podemos Sumar PSOE Cs CDS UCD PP CP AP Vox
Legislature	Election	Distribution
Constituent	1977	4 / 4
1st	1979	4 / 4
2nd	1982	5 / 3
3rd	1986	5 / 3
4th	1989	5 / 1 / 3
5th	1993	1 / 4 / 4
6th	1996	1 / 3 / 5
7th	2000	3 / 6
8th	2004	3 / 6
9th	2008	3 / 7
10th	2011	2 / 8
11th	2015	1 / 2 / 2 / 5
12th	2016	1 / 2 / 2 / 5
13th	2019 (Apr)	1 / 3 / 2 / 2 / 2
14th	2019 (Nov)	1 / 3 / 3 / 3
15th	2023	1 / 3 / 4 / 2

== General elections ==
=== 2026 ===
Summary of the 29 November 2026 Congress of Deputies election results in Murcia
Parties and alliances	Popular vote			Seats	
Parties and alliances	Votes	%	±pp	Total	+/−
People's Party (PP)					
Spanish Socialist Workers' Party (PSOE)					
Vox (Vox)					
Broad Front (FA)^{1}			n/a		
We Can (Podemos)^{1}			n/a		
Blank Seats to Leave Empty Seats (EB)					
Workers' Front (FO)					
Seniors in Action (3e)			New		
Communist Party of the Workers of Spain (PCTE)			New		
The Party is Over (SALF)			New		
Blank ballots					
Total				10	±0
Valid votes					
Invalid votes					
Votes cast / turnout					
Abstentions					
Registered voters	1,144,308				
Sources
Footnotes: ^{1} Within the Unite alliance in the 2023 election.

=== 2023 ===
Summary of the 23 July 2023 Congress of Deputies election results in Murcia
Parties and alliances	Popular vote			Seats	
Parties and alliances	Votes	%	±pp	Total	+/−
People's Party (PP)	307,972	41.18	+14.67	4	+1
Spanish Socialist Workers' Party (PSOE)	189,210	25.30	+0.52	3	±0
Vox (Vox)	163,124	21.81	–6.14	2	–1
Unite (Sumar)^{1}	71,578	9.57	–1.19	1	±0
Animalist Party with the Environment (PACMA)^{2}	5,063	0.68	–0.30	0	±0
For My Region (Por Mi Región)^{3}	1,698	0.23	–0.10	0	±0
Blank Seats to Leave Empty Seats (EB)	1,377	0.18	New	0	±0
Workers' Front (FO)	1,201	0.16	New	0	±0
Zero Cuts (Recortes Cero)	546	0.07	–0.05	0	±0
Walking Together (CJ)	453	0.06	New	0	±0
Spanish Phalanx of the CNSO (FE de las JONS)	376	0.05	New	0	±0
System Money Referendum (+RDS+)	165	0.02	New	0	±0
Blank ballots	5,034	0.67	–0.06		
Total	747,797			10	±0
Valid votes	747,797	99.01	+0.04		
Invalid votes	7,458	0.99	–0.04		
Votes cast / turnout	755,255	68.68	+0.65		
Abstentions	344,448	31.32	–0.65		
Registered voters	1,099,703				
Sources
Footnotes: ^{1} Unite results are compared to the combined totals of United We Can and More Country–Equo in the November 2019 election.; ^{2} Animalist Party with the Environment results are compared to Animalist Party Against Mistreatment of Animals totals in the November 2019 election.; ^{3} For My Region results are compared to We Are Region totals in the November 2019 election.

=== November 2019 ===
Summary of the 10 November 2019 Congress of Deputies election results in Murcia
Parties and alliances	Popular vote			Seats	
Parties and alliances	Votes	%	±pp	Total	+/−
Vox (Vox)	199,829	27.95	+9.33	3	+1
People's Party (PP)	189,500	26.51	+3.08	3	+1
Spanish Socialist Workers' Party (PSOE)	177,154	24.78	+0.01	3	±0
United We Can (Podemos–IU)	63,461	8.88	–1.53	1	±0
Citizens–Party of the Citizenry (Cs)	53,201	7.44	–12.10	0	–2
More Country–Equo (Más País–Equo)	13,439	1.88	New	0	±0
Animalist Party Against Mistreatment of Animals (PACMA)	7,005	0.98	–0.40	0	±0
We Are Region (Somos Región)	2,328	0.33	–0.32	0	±0
Spanish Communist Workers' Party (PCOE)	990	0.14	–0.01	0	±0
Zero Cuts–Green Group (Recortes Cero–GV)	881	0.12	–0.06	0	±0
Communist Party of the Peoples of Spain (PCPE)	490	0.07	–0.02	0	±0
Left in Positive (IZQP)	434	0.06	–0.03	0	±0
For a Fairer World (PUM+J)	431	0.06	New	0	±0
With You, We Are Democracy (Contigo)	317	0.04	New	0	±0
Plural Democracy (DPL)	214	0.03	–0.04	0	±0
Blank ballots	5,253	0.73	+0.11		
Total	714,927			10	±0
Valid votes	714,927	98.97	+0.04		
Invalid votes	7,418	1.03	–0.04		
Votes cast / turnout	722,345	68.03	–5.50		
Abstentions	339,496	31.97	+5.50		
Registered voters	1,061,841				

=== April 2019 ===
Summary of the 28 April 2019 Congress of Deputies election results in Murcia
Parties and alliances	Popular vote			Seats	
Parties and alliances	Votes	%	±pp	Total	+/−
Spanish Socialist Workers' Party (PSOE)	190,540	24.77	+4.46	3	+1
People's Party (PP)	180,163	23.43	–23.25	2	–3
Citizens–Party of the Citizenry (Cs)	150,289	19.54	+3.85	2	±0
Vox (Vox)	143,234	18.62	+18.25	2	+2
United We Can (Podemos–IU–Equo)	80,053	10.41	–4.10	1	±0
Animalist Party Against Mistreatment of Animals (PACMA)	10,611	1.38	+0.23	0	±0
We Are Region (Somos Región)	4,976	0.65	New	0	±0
Zero Cuts–Green Group (Recortes Cero–GV)	1,406	0.18	±0.00	0	±0
Spanish Communist Workers' Party (PCOE)	1,162	0.15	New	0	±0
Left in Positive (IZQP)	712	0.09	New	0	±0
Communist Party of the Peoples of Spain (PCPE)	663	0.09	±0.00	0	±0
Plural Democracy (DPL)	504	0.07	New	0	±0
Blank ballots	4,771	0.62	+0.10		
Total	769,084			10	±0
Valid votes	769,084	98.93	–0.24		
Invalid votes	8,339	1.07	+0.24		
Votes cast / turnout	777,423	73.53	+3.95		
Abstentions	279,873	26.47	–3.95		
Registered voters	1,057,296				

=== 2016 ===
Summary of the 26 June 2016 Congress of Deputies election results in Murcia
Parties and alliances	Popular vote			Seats	
Parties and alliances	Votes	%	±pp	Total	+/−
People's Party (PP)	333,109	46.68	+6.28	5	±0
Spanish Socialist Workers' Party (PSOE)	144,937	20.31	–0.01	2	±0
Citizens–Party of the Citizenry (C's)	111,961	15.69	–1.98	2	±0
United We Can (Podemos–IU–Equo)^{1}	103,522	14.51	–3.82	1	±0
Animalist Party Against Mistreatment of Animals (PACMA)	8,209	1.15	+0.24	0	±0
Vox (Vox)	2,622	0.37	–0.08	0	±0
Union, Progress and Democracy (UPyD)	2,083	0.29	–0.46	0	±0
Zero Cuts–Green Group (Recortes Cero–GV)	1,305	0.18	+0.01	0	±0
Blank Seats (EB)	1,069	0.15	±0.00	0	±0
Communist Party of the Peoples of Spain (PCPE)	627	0.09	–0.05	0	±0
Internationalist Solidarity and Self-Management (SAIn)	235	0.03	–0.02	0	±0
Spain Elders' Force (FME)	200	0.03	New	0	±0
Blank ballots	3,713	0.52	–0.10		
Total	713,592			10	±0
Valid votes	713,592	99.17	+0.04		
Invalid votes	5,944	0.83	–0.04		
Votes cast / turnout	719,536	69.58	–1.56		
Abstentions	314,539	30.42	+1.56		
Registered voters	1,034,075				
Sources
Footnotes: ^{1} United We Can results are compared to the combined totals of We Can and Popular Unity in Common–United Left/Greens in the 2015 election.

=== 2015 ===
Summary of the 20 December 2015 Congress of Deputies election results in Murcia
Parties and alliances	Popular vote			Seats	
Parties and alliances	Votes	%	±pp	Total	+/−
People's Party (PP)	293,943	40.40	–23.82	5	–3
Spanish Socialist Workers' Party (PSOE)	147,883	20.32	–0.67	2	±0
Citizens–Party of the Citizenry (C's)	128,570	17.67	New	2	+2
We Can (Podemos)	110,601	15.20	New	1	+1
Popular Unity in Common–United Left/Greens (UPeC–IU)	22,767	3.13	–2.57	0	±0
Animalist Party Against Mistreatment of Animals (PACMA)	6,591	0.91	+0.55	0	±0
Union, Progress and Democracy (UPyD)	5,442	0.75	–5.51	0	±0
Vox (Vox)	3,282	0.45	New	0	±0
Zero Cuts–Green Group (Recortes Cero–GV)	1,268	0.17	New	0	±0
Blank Seats (EB)	1,063	0.15	–0.09	0	±0
Communist Party of the Peoples of Spain (PCPE)	1,051	0.14	–0.01	0	±0
Internationalist Solidarity and Self-Management (SAIn)	330	0.05	New	0	±0
Death to the System (+MAS+)	313	0.04	–0.07	0	±0
Blank ballots	4,511	0.62	–0.29		
Total	727,615			10	±0
Valid votes	727,615	99.13	+0.06		
Invalid votes	6,382	0.87	–0.06		
Votes cast / turnout	733,997	71.14	–2.97		
Abstentions	297,736	28.86	+2.97		
Registered voters	1,031,733				

=== 2011 ===
Summary of the 20 November 2011 Congress of Deputies election results in Murcia
Parties and alliances	Popular vote			Seats	
Parties and alliances	Votes	%	±pp	Total	+/−
People's Party (PP)	471,851	64.22	+2.98	8	+1
Spanish Socialist Workers' Party (PSOE)	154,225	20.99	–11.86	2	–1
Union, Progress and Democracy (UPyD)	45,984	6.26	+5.32	0	±0
United Left–Greens of the Region of Murcia: Plural Left (IU–V–RM)	41,896	5.70	+2.76	0	±0
Equo (Equo)	4,464	0.61	New	0	±0
Animalist Party Against Mistreatment of Animals (PACMA)	2,629	0.36	+0.21	0	±0
Blank Seats (EB)	1,745	0.24	New	0	±0
Communist Party of the Peoples of Spain (PCPE)	1,130	0.15	+0.09	0	±0
Liberal Democratic Centre (CDL)	1,127	0.15	+0.05	0	±0
Death to the System (+MAS+)	791	0.11	New	0	±0
Party for the Regeneration of Democracy in Spain (PRDE)	678	0.09	New	0	±0
Centre and Democracy Forum (CyD)	528	0.07	New	0	±0
Republicans (RPS)	485	0.07	New	0	±0
Communist Unification of Spain (UCE)	465	0.06	New	0	±0
Blank ballots	6,688	0.91	+0.17		
Total	734,686			10	±0
Valid votes	734,686	99.07	–0.23		
Invalid votes	6,868	0.93	+0.23		
Votes cast / turnout	741,554	74.11	–5.47		
Abstentions	259,070	25.89	+5.47		
Registered voters	1,000,624				

=== 2008 ===
Summary of the 9 March 2008 Congress of Deputies election results in Murcia
Parties and alliances	Popular vote			Seats	
Parties and alliances	Votes	%	±pp	Total	+/−
People's Party (PP)	469,380	61.24	+3.82	7	+1
Spanish Socialist Workers' Party (PSOE)	251,822	32.85	–2.15	3	±0
United Left of the Region of Murcia–Alternative (IURM)	22,512	2.94	–1.33	0	±0
Union, Progress and Democracy (UPyD)	7,172	0.94	New	0	±0
The Greens (Verdes)	3,496	0.46	–0.52	0	±0
Anti-Bullfighting Party Against Mistreatment of Animals (PACMA)	1,178	0.15	New	0	±0
Liberal Democratic Centre (CDL)	767	0.10	New	0	±0
Social Democratic Party (PSD)	717	0.09	New	0	±0
For a Fairer World (PUM+J)	666	0.09	New	0	±0
Citizens–Party of the Citizenry (C's)	432	0.06	New	0	±0
Communist Party of the Peoples of Spain (PCPE)	431	0.06	±0.00	0	±0
Citizens for Blank Votes (CenB)	417	0.05	–0.08	0	±0
National Democracy (DN)	333	0.04	±0.00	0	±0
Spanish Phalanx of the CNSO (FE de las JONS)	318	0.04	–0.01	0	±0
Family and Life Party (PFyV)	292	0.04	–0.05	0	±0
Authentic Phalanx (FA)	176	0.02	–0.03	0	±0
Spanish Alternative (AES)	175	0.02	New	0	±0
National Alliance (AN)	132	0.02	New	0	±0
Spanish Front (Frente)	132	0.02	New	0	±0
Centrist Party (PCTR)	124	0.02	New	0	±0
Spain 2000 (E–2000)	116	0.02	±0.00	0	±0
Carlist Traditionalist Communion (CTC)	76	0.01	New	0	±0
Blank ballots	5,649	0.74	–0.69		
Total	766,510			10	+1
Valid votes	766,510	99.30	–0.08		
Invalid votes	5,402	0.70	+0.08		
Votes cast / turnout	771,912	79.58	+2.52		
Abstentions	198,034	20.42	–2.52		
Registered voters	969,946				

=== 2004 ===
Summary of the 14 March 2004 Congress of Deputies election results in Murcia
Parties and alliances	Popular vote			Seats	
Parties and alliances	Votes	%	±pp	Total	+/−
People's Party (PP)	413,902	57.42	–0.66	6	±0
Spanish Socialist Workers' Party (PSOE)	252,246	35.00	+2.62	3	±0
United Left (IU)	30,787	4.27	–1.97	0	±0
The Greens of the Region of Murcia (LVRM)	7,074	0.98	±0.00	0	±0
Democratic and Social Centre (CDS)	1,153	0.16	+0.07	0	±0
Citizens for Blank Votes (CenB)	957	0.13	New	0	±0
Family and Life Party (PFyV)	657	0.09	New	0	±0
Republican Left (IR)	521	0.07	New	0	±0
Spanish Democratic Party (PADE)	426	0.06	–0.15	0	±0
Communist Party of the Peoples of Spain (PCPE)	419	0.06	New	0	±0
National Workers' Party (PNT)	379	0.05	New	0	±0
Authentic Phalanx (FA)	361	0.05	New	0	±0
Spanish Phalanx of the CNSO (FE de las JONS)	353	0.05	New	0	±0
Citizens' Convergence of the South-East (CCSE)	308	0.04	–0.06	0	±0
National Democracy (DN)	258	0.04	New	0	±0
National Democratic Party of Spain (PDNE)	232	0.03	New	0	±0
The Phalanx (FE)	228	0.03	–0.06	0	±0
Republican Social Movement (MSR)	183	0.03	New	0	±0
Blank ballots	10,331	1.43	+0.36		
Total	720,775			9	±0
Valid votes	720,775	99.38	–0.05		
Invalid votes	4,491	0.62	+0.05		
Votes cast / turnout	725,266	77.06	+3.52		
Abstentions	215,879	22.94	–3.52		
Registered voters	941,145				

=== 2000 ===
Summary of the 12 March 2000 Congress of Deputies election results in Murcia
Parties and alliances	Popular vote			Seats	
Parties and alliances	Votes	%	±pp	Total	+/−
People's Party (PP)	389,564	58.08	+8.19	6	+1
Spanish Socialist Workers' Party–Progressives (PSOE–p)	217,179	32.38	–5.61	3	±0
United Left (IU)	41,842	6.24	–4.29	0	–1
The Greens of the Region of Murcia (LVRM)	6,555	0.98	New	0	±0
Liberal Independent Group (GIL)	2,362	0.35	New	0	±0
Spanish Democratic Party (PADE)	1,389	0.21	New	0	±0
Self-employed Spanish Party (PEDA)	1,130	0.17	New	0	±0
Citizens' Convergence of the South-East (CCSE)	645	0.10	±0.00	0	±0
Centrist Union–Democratic and Social Centre (UC–CDS)	635	0.09	–0.18	0	±0
The Phalanx (FE)	604	0.09	New	0	±0
New Region (NR)	598	0.09	–0.12	0	±0
Natural Law Party (PLN)	410	0.06	New	0	±0
Spain 2000 Platform (ES2000)	383	0.06	New	0	±0
Catalan State (EC)	203	0.03	New	0	±0
Blank ballots	7,185	1.07	+0.28		
Total	670,684			9	±0
Valid votes	670,684	99.43	–0.11		
Invalid votes	3,832	0.57	+0.11		
Votes cast / turnout	674,516	73.54	–8.46		
Abstentions	242,701	26.46	+8.46		
Registered voters	917,217				

=== 1996 ===
Summary of the 3 March 1996 Congress of Deputies election results in Murcia
Parties and alliances	Popular vote			Seats	
Parties and alliances	Votes	%	±pp	Total	+/−
People's Party (PP)	350,337	49.89	+2.60	5	+1
Spanish Socialist Workers' Party (PSOE)	266,738	37.99	–0.60	3	–1
United Left–The Greens Region of Murcia (IU–LV)	73,961	10.53	+0.82	1	±0
Centrist Union (UC)	1,916	0.27	–1.93	0	±0
New Region (NR)	1,452	0.21	New	0	±0
Workers' Revolutionary Party (PRT)	892	0.13	New	0	±0
Alliance for National Unity (AUN)	711	0.10	New	0	±0
Authentic Spanish Phalanx (FEA)	669	0.10	New	0	±0
Blank ballots	5,516	0.79	+0.27		
Total	702,192			9	±0
Valid votes	702,192	99.54	+0.06		
Invalid votes	3,251	0.46	–0.06		
Votes cast / turnout	705,443	82.00	+0.44		
Abstentions	154,862	18.00	–0.44		
Registered voters	860,305				

=== 1993 ===
Summary of the 6 June 1993 Congress of Deputies election results in Murcia
Parties and alliances	Popular vote			Seats	
Parties and alliances	Votes	%	±pp	Total	+/−
People's Party (PP)	310,507	47.29	+17.31	4	+1
Spanish Socialist Workers' Party (PSOE)	253,324	38.59	–7.47	4	–1
United Left (IU)	63,717	9.71	+0.52	1	+1
Democratic and Social Centre (CDS)	14,442	2.20	–8.16	0	–1
The Greens (LV)^{1}	5,085	0.77	+0.12	0	±0
The Ecologists (LE)	1,685	0.26	–0.44	0	±0
Rainbow (Arcoiris)	1,407	0.21	New	0	±0
Ruiz-Mateos Group (ARM)	1,399	0.21	–0.91	0	±0
Revolutionary Workers' Party (POR)	686	0.10	New	0	±0
Humanist Party (PH)	487	0.07	–0.04	0	±0
Natural Law Party (PLN)	362	0.06	New	0	±0
Communist Unification of Spain (UCE)	0	0.00	New	0	±0
Blank ballots	3,433	0.52	+0.05		
Total	656,534			9	±0
Valid votes	656,534	99.48	+0.15		
Invalid votes	3,418	0.52	–0.15		
Votes cast / turnout	659,952	81.56	+7.31		
Abstentions	149,234	18.44	–7.31		
Registered voters	809,186				
Sources
Footnotes: ^{1} The Greens results are compared to The Greens–Green List totals in the 1989 election.

=== 1989 ===
Summary of the 29 October 1989 Congress of Deputies election results in Murcia
Parties and alliances	Popular vote			Seats	
Parties and alliances	Votes	%	±pp	Total	+/−
Spanish Socialist Workers' Party (PSOE)	256,107	46.06	–2.79	5	±0
People's Party (PP)^{1}	166,712	29.98	–4.35	3	±0
Democratic and Social Centre (CDS)	57,634	10.36	+2.02	1	+1
United Left (IU)	51,105	9.19	+4.67	0	±0
Ruiz-Mateos Group (Ruiz-Mateos)	6,253	1.12	New	0	±0
The Ecologist Greens (LVE)	3,905	0.70	New	0	±0
The Greens–Green List (LV–LV)	3,589	0.65	New	0	±0
Workers' Socialist Party (PST)	2,963	0.53	+0.16	0	±0
Communist Party of the Peoples of Spain (PCPE)	1,602	0.29	New	0	±0
Workers' Party of Spain–Communist Unity (PTE–UC)^{2}	1,557	0.28	–0.28	0	±0
Spanish Phalanx of the CNSO (FE–JONS)	836	0.15	–0.13	0	±0
Humanist Party (PH)	633	0.11	New	0	±0
Alliance for the Republic (AxR)^{3}	547	0.10	–0.06	0	±0
Blank ballots	2,640	0.47	–0.02		
Total	556,083			9	+1
Valid votes	556,083	99.33	+0.82		
Invalid votes	3,741	0.67	–0.82		
Votes cast / turnout	559,824	74.25	–0.41		
Abstentions	194,156	25.75	+0.41		
Registered voters	753,980				
Sources
Footnotes: ^{1} People's Party results are compared to People's Coalition totals in the 1986 election.; ^{2} Workers' Party of Spain–Communist Unity results are compared to Communists' Unity Board totals in the 1986 election.; ^{3} Alliance for the Republic results are compared to Internationalist Socialist Workers' Party totals in the 1986 election.

=== 1986 ===
Summary of the 22 June 1986 Congress of Deputies election results in Murcia
Parties and alliances	Popular vote			Seats	
Parties and alliances	Votes	%	±pp	Total	+/−
Spanish Socialist Workers' Party (PSOE)	261,922	48.85	–1.91	5	±0
People's Coalition (AP–PDP–PL)^{1}	184,109	34.33	–1.25	3	±0
Democratic and Social Centre (CDS)	44,724	8.34	+6.42	0	±0
United Left (IU)^{2}	24,222	4.52	+0.76	0	±0
Democratic Reformist Party (PRD)	7,067	1.32	New	0	±0
Communists' Unity Board (MUC)	3,005	0.56	New	0	±0
Workers' Socialist Party (PST)	1,959	0.37	New	0	±0
Spanish Phalanx of the CNSO (FE–JONS)	1,488	0.28	New	0	±0
Murcian Regionalist Party (PRM)	1,401	0.26	New	0	±0
Communist Unification of Spain (UCE)	1,352	0.25	+0.12	0	±0
Republican Popular Unity (UPR)^{3}	884	0.16	+0.07	0	±0
Internationalist Socialist Workers' Party (POSI)	881	0.16	New	0	±0
Party of the Communists of Catalonia (PCC)	580	0.11	New	0	±0
Blank ballots	2,624	0.49	+0.14		
Total	536,218			8	±0
Valid votes	536,218	98.51	+0.02		
Invalid votes	8,105	1.49	–0.02		
Votes cast / turnout	544,323	74.66	–7.83		
Abstentions	184,718	25.34	+7.83		
Registered voters	729,041				
Sources
Footnotes: ^{1} People's Coalition results are compared to People's Alliance–People's Democratic Party totals in the 1982 election.; ^{2} United Left results are compared to Communist Party of Spain totals in the 1982 election.; ^{3} Republican Popular Unity results are compared to Communist Party of Spain (Marxist–Leninist) totals in the 1982 election.

=== 1982 ===
Summary of the 28 October 1982 Congress of Deputies election results in Murcia
Parties and alliances	Popular vote			Seats	
Parties and alliances	Votes	%	±pp	Total	+/−
Spanish Socialist Workers' Party (PSOE)	270,552	50.76	+11.61	5	+1
People's Alliance–People's Democratic Party (AP–PDP)^{1}	189,642	35.58	+29.90	3	+3
Union of the Democratic Centre (UCD)	34,354	6.45	–32.62	0	–4
Communist Party of Spain (PCE)	20,065	3.76	–4.15	0	±0
Democratic and Social Centre (CDS)	10,211	1.92	New	0	±0
New Force (FN)^{2}	2,501	0.47	–1.05	0	±0
Spanish Communist Workers' Party (PCOE)	1,007	0.19	New	0	±0
Communist Unification of Spain (UCE)	708	0.13	–0.24	0	±0
Independent Spanish Phalanx (FEI)	555	0.10	New	0	±0
Communist Unity Candidacy (CUC)^{3}	527	0.10	–0.13	0	±0
Falangist Movement of Spain (MFE)	522	0.10	New	0	±0
Communist Party of Spain (Marxist–Leninist) (PCE (m–l))	463	0.09	New	0	±0
Communist Movement of the Murcian Region (MCRM)	0	0.00	–0.25	0	±0
Socialist Party (PS)^{4}	0	0.00	–1.71	0	±0
Blank ballots	1,854	0.35	–0.11		
Total	532,961			8	±0
Valid votes	532,961	98.49	–0.26		
Invalid votes	8,197	1.51	+0.26		
Votes cast / turnout	541,158	82.49	+9.78		
Abstentions	114,894	17.51	–9.78		
Registered voters	656,052				
Sources
Footnotes: ^{1} People's Alliance–People's Democratic Party results are compared to Democratic Coalition totals in the 1979 election.; ^{2} New Force results are compared to National Union totals in the 1979 election.; ^{3} Communist Unity Candidacy results are compared to Workers' Communist Party totals in the 1979 election.; ^{4} Socialist Party results are compared to Spanish Socialist Workers' Party (historical) totals in the 1979 election.

=== 1979 ===
Summary of the 1 March 1979 Congress of Deputies election results in Murcia
Parties and alliances	Popular vote			Seats	
Parties and alliances	Votes	%	±pp	Total	+/−
Spanish Socialist Workers' Party (PSOE)^{1}	178,621	39.15	–0.85	4	±0
Union of the Democratic Centre (UCD)	178,229	39.07	–1.63	4	±0
Communist Party of Spain (PCE)	36,090	7.91	+1.22	0	±0
Democratic Coalition (CD)^{2}	25,903	5.68	–1.08	0	±0
Spanish Socialist Workers' Party (historical) (PSOEh)^{3}	7,784	1.71	+0.39	0	±0
National Union (UN)^{4}	6,925	1.52	+1.00	0	±0
Cantonal Party (PCAN)	6,290	1.38	New	0	±0
Workers' Revolutionary Organization (ORT)^{5}	4,715	1.03	+0.45	0	±0
Carlist Party (PC)	1,847	0.40	New	0	±0
Party of Labour of Spain (PTE)^{6}	1,841	0.40	+0.05	0	±0
Communist Unification of Spain (UCE)	1,684	0.37	New	0	±0
Spanish Phalanx of the CNSO (Authentic) (FE–JONS(A))	1,469	0.32	–0.05	0	±0
Communist Movement–Organization of Communist Left (MC–OIC)	1,157	0.25	New	0	±0
Workers' Communist Party (PCT)	1,050	0.23	New	0	±0
Revolutionary Communist League (LCR)	522	0.11	New	0	±0
Union for the Freedom of Speech (ULE)	0	0.00	New	0	±0
Communist League (LC)	0	0.00	New	0	±0
Authentic Spanish Phalanx (FEA)	0	0.00	New	0	±0
Blank ballots	2,082	0.46	+0.31		
Total	456,209			8	±0
Valid votes	456,209	98.75	–0.26		
Invalid votes	5,762	1.25	+0.26		
Votes cast / turnout	461,971	72.71	–9.09		
Abstentions	173,405	27.29	+9.09		
Registered voters	635,376				
Sources
Footnotes: ^{1} Spanish Socialist Workers' Party results are compared to the combined totals of Spanish Socialist Workers' Party and People's Socialist Party–Socialist Unity in the 1977 election.; ^{2} Democratic Coalition results are compared to People's Alliance totals in the 1977 election.; ^{3} Spanish Socialist Workers' Party (historical) results are compared to Democratic Socialist Alliance totals in the 1977 election.; ^{4} National Union results are compared to New Force totals in the 1977 election.; ^{5} Workers' Revolutionary Organization results are compared to Workers' Electoral Group totals in the 1977 election.; ^{6} Party of Labour of Spain results are compared to Democratic Left Front totals in the 1977 election.

=== 1977 ===
Summary of the 15 June 1977 Congress of Deputies election results in Murcia
Parties and alliances	Popular vote			Seats	
Parties and alliances	Votes	%	±pp	Total	+/−
Union of the Democratic Centre (UCD)	181,633	40.70	n/a	4	n/a
Spanish Socialist Workers' Party (PSOE)	155,871	34.93	n/a	4	n/a
People's Alliance (AP)	30,167	6.76	n/a	0	n/a
Communist Party of Spain (PCE)	29,840	6.69	n/a	0	n/a
People's Socialist Party–Socialist Unity (PSP–US)	22,627	5.07	n/a	0	n/a
Federation of Christian Democracy (FPD–ID)	9,166	2.05	n/a	0	n/a
Democratic Socialist Alliance (ASDCI)	5,886	1.32	n/a	0	n/a
Workers' Electoral Group (AET)	2,606	0.58	n/a	0	n/a
New Force (FN)	2,313	0.52	n/a	0	n/a
Spanish Social Reform (RSE)	2,291	0.51	n/a	0	n/a
Spanish Phalanx of the CNSO (Authentic) (FE–JONS(A))	1,668	0.37	n/a	0	n/a
Democratic Left Front (FDI)	1,544	0.35	n/a	0	n/a
Blank ballots	660	0.15	n/a		
Total	446,272			8	n/a
Valid votes	446,272	99.01	n/a		
Invalid votes	4,480	0.99	n/a		
Votes cast / turnout	450,752	81.80	n/a		
Abstentions	100,269	18.20	n/a		
Registered voters	551,021				

== Bibliography ==
- Ley 1/1977, de 4 de enero, para la Reforma Política (Fundamental Law 1/1977). Official State Gazette (in Spanish). 4 January 1977. BOE-A-1977-165.
- Real Decreto-ley 20/1977, de 18 de marzo, sobre Normas Electorales (Royal Decree-Law 20/1977). Official State Gazette (in Spanish). 18 March 1977. BOE-A-1977-7445.
- Constitución Española (Constitution). Official State Gazette (in Spanish). 27 December 1978. BOE-A-1978-31229.
- Ley Orgánica 5/1985, de 19 de junio, del Régimen Electoral General (Organic Law 5/1985). Official State Gazette (in Spanish). 19 June 1985. BOE-A-1985-11672.
- Carreras de Odriozola, Albert; Tafunell Sambola, Xavier (2005) [1989]. Estadísticas históricas de España, siglos XIX-XX (PDF) (in Spanish). Vol. 1 (II ed.). Bilbao: Fundación BBVA. pp. 1072–1097. ISBN 84-96515-00-1. Archived from the original (PDF) on 24 September 2015.
