= 1999 Spanish local elections in the Region of Murcia =

This article presents the results breakdown of the local elections held in the Region of Murcia on 13 June 1999. The following tables show detailed results in the autonomous community's most populous municipalities, sorted alphabetically.

== City control ==
The following table lists party control in the most populous municipalities, including provincial capitals (highlighted in bold). Gains for a party are highlighted in that party's colour.

Municipality	Population	Previous control	New control
Cartagena	175,628	People's Party (PP)	People's Party (PP)
Lorca	69,930	Spanish Socialist Workers' Party (PSOE)	Spanish Socialist Workers' Party (PSOE)
**Murcia**	349,040	People's Party (PP)	People's Party (PP)

== Municipalities ==
=== Cartagena ===
Population: 175,628

← Summary of the 13 June 1999 City Council of Cartagena election results →
Parties and alliances	Popular vote			Seats	
Parties and alliances	Votes	%	±pp	Total	+/−
People's Party (PP)	40,527	50.60	+2.03	**17**	+2
Spanish Socialist Workers' Party (PSOE)	23,091	28.83	−1.33	**9**	±0
United Left of the Region of Murcia (IURM)	4,519	5.64	−5.01	**1**	−2
Coalition for Cartagena. Convergence–Cantonal Party (CCCC)^{1}	3,396	4.24	+0.43	0	±0
Independent of Cartagena and Region (ICC)	2,975	3.71	New	0	±0
Minor Sea Independent Party–Neighbourhood Indep. Movement (PIMM–MIV)	2,212	2.76	+0.77	0	±0
The Greens (LV)	1,076	1.34	New	0	±0
Action and Development (AYD)	291	0.36	New	0	±0
The Phalanx (FE)	280	0.35	New	0	±0
Spanish Democratic Party (PADE)	262	0.33	New	0	±0
Centrist Union–Democratic and Social Centre (UC–CDS)	259	0.32	−0.62	0	±0
Blank ballots	1,197	1.49	+0.52		
**Total**	**80,085**			**27**	**±0**
Valid votes	80,085	99.35	−0.11		
Invalid votes	526	0.65	+0.11		
**Votes cast / turnout**	**80,611**	**55.56**	**−10.40**		
Abstentions	64,473	44.44	+10.40		
**Registered voters**	**145,084**				
Sources
Footnotes: ^{1} Coalition for Cartagena. Convergence–Cantonal Party results are compared to Cantonal Party totals in the 1995 election.

=== Lorca ===
Population: 69,930

← Summary of the 13 June 1999 City Council of Lorca election results →
Parties and alliances	Popular vote			Seats	
Parties and alliances	Votes	%	±pp	Total	+/−
Spanish Socialist Workers' Party (PSOE)	24,655	64.45	+16.44	**17**	+4
People's Party (PP)	11,041	28.86	−11.66	**8**	−2
United Left of the Region of Murcia (IURM)	1,797	4.70	−3.02	0	−2
Spanish Democratic Party (PADE)	366	0.96	New	0	±0
Blank ballots	394	1.03	−0.20		
**Total**	**38,253**			**25**	**±0**
Valid votes	38,253	99.30	+0.27		
Invalid votes	269	0.70	−0.27		
**Votes cast / turnout**	**38,522**	**68.57**	**−3.40**		
Abstentions	17,655	31.43	+3.40		
**Registered voters**	**56,177**				

=== Murcia ===
Population: 349,040

← Summary of the 13 June 1999 City Council of Murcia election results →
Parties and alliances	Popular vote			Seats	
Parties and alliances	Votes	%	±pp	Total	+/−
People's Party (PP)	107,394	57.68	−1.43	**18**	±0
Spanish Socialist Workers' Party (PSOE)	58,091	31.20	+6.11	**9**	+2
United Left of the Region of Murcia (IURM)	13,446	7.22	−6.05	**2**	−2
Spanish Democratic Party (PADE)	1,540	0.83	New	0	±0
Centrist Union–Democratic and Social Centre (UC–CDS)	1,115	0.60	−0.11	0	±0
Union of the Peoples of Murcia (UPM)	1,108	0.60	New	0	±0
Blank ballots	3,484	1.87	+0.78		
**Total**	**186,178**			**29**	**±0**
Valid votes	186,178	99.44	−0.06		
Invalid votes	1,042	0.56	+0.06		
**Votes cast / turnout**	**187,220**	**65.94**	**−10.62**		
Abstentions	96,707	34.06	+10.62		
**Registered voters**	**283,927**				

== See also ==
- 1999 Murcian regional election
