= Hypothetical opinion polling for the 2023 Spanish general election =

In the run up to the 2023 Spanish general election, various organisations carry out opinion polling to gauge voting intention in Spain for a number of hypothetical scenarios during the term of the 14th Cortes Generales. Results of such polls are displayed in this article. The date range for these opinion polls is from the previous general election, held on 10 November 2019, to the day the next election was held, on 23 July 2023.

== Sumar / Yolanda Díaz's platform ==
Polling firm/Commissioner	Fieldwork date	Sample size	Turnout	PSOE	People's Party (Spain)	Vox	Sumar	Podemos	IU	CS	ERC–Sobiranistes	Más País	JxCat	PNV	EH Bildu	CUP	CC–NCa	BNG	NA+	PRC	EV	Lead
SocioMétrica/El Español	30 Jan–3 Feb 2023	900	?	20.9; 82	31.0; 130	15.2; 47	18.2; 53	(Note: Within Sumar.)		1.5; 0	2.7; 12		1.9; 8	1.4; 6	1.1; 4	0.8; 1	0.6; 2	0.6; 1	0.3; 2	0.2; 1	0.6; 2	10.1
Metroscopia	12–15 Dec 2022	?	65	24.8; 96	31.1; 134	16.8; 57	2.4; 1	9.4; 21		0.8; 0	–	1.8; 1/2	–	–	–	–	–	–	–	–	–	6.3
40dB/Prisa	23–26 Nov 2022	2,000	?	25.0; 100/108	27.3; 118/127	14.1; 44/49	9.1; 20/24	5.9; 6/9	2.4; 0/2	2.5; 0/1	? 13	1.9; 2	? 9	? 6	? 6	? 1	? 2	? 2	? 2	? 1	? 1	2.3
40dB/Prisa	23–26 Nov 2022	2,000	?	24.8; 91/98	27.6; 109/118	14.8; 41/50	18.7; 53/62			2.3; 0/1	? 12		? 8	? 6	? 4	? 1	? 2	? 1	? 2	? 1	? 1	2.8
EM-Analytics/Electomanía	12–19 Nov 2021	1,564	?	18.3; 63	25.7; 99	18.2; 63	26.5; 93			2.8; 1	2.4; 10		1.7; 7	1.2; 5	0.9; 2	0.8; 1	0.5; 1	0.6; 1	0.4; 2	0.2; 1	0.1; 1	0.8
EM-Analytics/Electomanía	12–19 Nov 2021	1,564	?	21.2; 81	25.7; 104	18.2; 67	19.1; 55			2.9; 1	3.0; 12	1.9; 4	2.1; 8	1.2; 6	1.0; 4	0.8; 1	0.5; 1	0.7; 1	0.4; 2	0.2; 1	0.1; 1	4.5

== Party splits ==
=== Macarena Olona ===
Polling firm/Commissioner	Fieldwork date	Sample size	Turnout	PSOE	PP	Vox	Unidas Podemos	CS	ERC–Sobiranistes	Más País	JxCat	PNV	EH Bildu	CUP	CC–NCa	BNG	NA+	PRC	EV	MO	Lead
EM-Analytics/Electomanía	20 Sep–2 Oct 2022	1,987	?	23.4; 95	27.9; 130	12.6; 38	11.5; 31	1.6; 0	2.6; 11	2.0; 4	2.2; 10	1.7; 7	1.4; 5	0.9; 2	0.5; 0	1.0; 2	0.2; 1	0.1; 1	0.3; 2	11.1; 11	3.5

=== Ayuso and Álvarez de Toledo ===
Polling firm/Commissioner	Fieldwork date	Sample size	Turnout	PSOE	People's Party (Spain)	Vox	Unidas Podemos	CS	ERC–Sobiranistes	Más País	JxCat	PNV	EH Bildu	CUP	CC–NCa	BNG	NA+	PRC	TE	A&C	Lead
EM-Analytics/Electomanía	3–10 Dec 2021	2,177	68	24.4; 94	16.1; 61	15.6; 52	10.7; 26	18.4; 67	3.5; 13	2.5; 5	2.4; 9	1.5; 7	1.3; 6	1.0; 2	0.4; 1	0.8; 2	0.4; 2	0.2; 1	0.1; 1	(Note: Within CS.)	6.0
EM-Analytics/Electomanía	3–10 Dec 2021	2,177	68	24.8; 100	20.6; 88	23.0; 88	10.6; 26	3.4; 1	3.4; 13	2.6; 5	2.3; 10	1.5; 6	1.3; 5	0.9; 2	0.5; 1	0.9; 2	0.3; 1	0.2; 1	0.1; 1	(Note: Within Vox.)	1.8
EM-Analytics/Electomanía	3–10 Dec 2021	2,177	72	24.7; 102	13.9; 52	11.7; 34	10.8; 31	2.6; 1	3.2; 14	3.3; 5	2.4; 10	0.9; 3	1.2; 5	1.0; 2	0.5; 2	0.8; 2	0.2; 1	0.2; 1	0.1; 1	21.5; 83	3.2

== PP ==
=== PP candidates ===
Polling firm/Commissioner	Fieldwork date	Sample size	Turnout	PSOE	PP (Isabel Díaz Ayuso)	Vox	Unidas Podemos	CS	ERC–Sobiranistes	Más País	JxCat	PNV	EH Bildu	CUP	CC–NCa	BNG	NA+	PRC	TE	Lead
EM-Analytics/Electomanía	4–6 May 2021	1,825	?	26.4; 106	28.5; 122	15.0; 46	11.1; 29	3.0; 1	3.4; 13	2.1; 4	2.4; 10	1.6; 6	1.3; 5	0.9; 2	0.5; 1	0.6; 1	0.4; 2	0.3; 1	0.1; 1	2.1

=== PP + Cs ===
Polling firm/Commissioner	Fieldwork date	Sample size	Turnout	PSOE	PP+Cs	Vox	Unidas Podemos	ERC–Sobiranistes	Más País	JxCat	PNV	EH Bildu	CUP	CC–NCa	BNG	NA+	PRC	TE	Lead
SocioMétrica/El Español	28 Dec–5 Jan 2021	1,206	?	26.7; 103	29.6; 123	16.7; 54	10.5; 25	3.4; 14	2.5; 3	2.7; 10	1.8; 7	1.3; 5	0.7; 1	0.5; 1	0.7; 1	0.3; 1	0.3; 1	0.1; 1	2.9
ElectoPanel/Electomanía	3–5 Feb 2020	1,490	?	28.3; 113	26.8; 113	15.7; 47	12.8; 33	3.6; 14	1.7; 2	2.7; 10	1.5; 6	1.1; 4	0.8; 1	0.5; 2	0.5; 1	0.4; 2	0.2; 1	0.1; 1	1.5

== Empty Spain ==
Polling firm/Commissioner	Fieldwork date	Sample size	Turnout	PSOE	PP	Vox	Unidas Podemos	CS	ERC–Sobiranistes	Más País	JxCat	PNV	EH Bildu	CUP	CC–NCa	BNG	NA+	PRC	EV	Lead
SocioMétrica/El Español	5–8 Nov 2021	1,200	?	25.5; 100	24.9; 101	16.8; 55	12.2; 34	3.9; 2	3.2; 13	3.3; 5	1.8; 7	1.4; 6	1.0; 4	0.9; 2	0.6; 2	0.6; 1	0.4; 2	0.2; 1	1.1; 15	0.6
EM-Analytics/Electomanía	22–29 Oct 2021	1,228	?	24.8; 96	27.2; 115	17.1; 55	10.6; 27	2.8; 1	3.3; 13	2.9; 6	2.3; 9	1.6; 7	1.1; 5	0.9; 2	0.5; 1	0.7; 2	0.4; 2	0.3; 1	1.8; 8	2.4
