= 2019 Spanish local elections in the Region of Murcia =

This article presents the results breakdown of the local elections held in the Region of Murcia on 26 May 2019. The following tables show detailed results in the autonomous community's most populous municipalities, sorted alphabetically.

== City control ==
The following table lists party control in the most populous municipalities, including provincial capitals (shown in bold). Gains for a party are displayed with the cell's background shaded in that party's colour.

Municipality	Population	Previous control	New control
Cartagena	213,943	Spanish Socialist Workers' Party (PSOE)	Spanish Socialist Workers' Party (PSOE) (INDEP in 2019; PP in 2021)
Lorca	93,079	People's Party (PP)	Spanish Socialist Workers' Party (PSOE)
**Murcia**	447,182	People's Party (PP)	People's Party (PP) (PSOE in 2021)

== Municipalities ==
=== Cartagena ===
Population: 213,943

← Summary of the 26 May 2019 City Council of Cartagena election results →
Parties and alliances	Popular vote			Seats	
Parties and alliances	Votes	%	±pp	Total	+/−
Citizens' Movement of Cartagena (MCC)	23,934	27.44	+10.52	**8**	+3
People's Party (PP)	22,212	25.47	−5.27	**7**	−3
Spanish Socialist Workers' Party (PSOE)	18,902	21.67	+3.83	**6**	±0
Citizens–Party of the Citizenry (Cs)	7,143	8.19	−3.52	**2**	−1
Vox (Vox)	6,938	7.96	+6.85	**2**	+2
United We Can–United Left Greens–Equo (Podemos–IUV–Equo)^{1}	6,041	6.93	−10.58	**2**	−1
We Are Region (Somos Región)	961	1.10	New	0	±0
Cantonal Party (PCAN)	316	0.36	−0.30	0	±0
With You, We Are Democracy (Contigo)	222	0.25	New	0	±0
Actual Equality (IGRE)	134	0.15	New	0	±0
Blank ballots	405	0.46	−0.89		
**Total**	**87,208**			**27**	**±0**
Valid votes	87,208	99.50	+1.02		
Invalid votes	435	0.50	−1.02		
**Votes cast / turnout**	**87,643**	**57.08**	**−0.76**		
Abstentions	65,888	42.92	+0.76		
**Registered voters**	**153,531**				
Sources
Footnotes: ^{1} United We Can–United Left Greens–Equo results are compared to the combined totals of Cartagena Yes We Can, Winning Cartagena.Plural Left and Equo in the 2015 election.

=== Lorca ===
Population: 93,079

← Summary of the 26 May 2019 City Council of Lorca election results →
Parties and alliances	Popular vote			Seats	
Parties and alliances	Votes	%	±pp	Total	+/−
People's Party (PP)	14,473	37.40	−6.68	**10**	−3
Spanish Socialist Workers' Party (PSOE)	13,957	36.07	+5.55	**10**	+2
United Left–Greens Lorca.Change the Region of Murcia (IU–V.CR)	2,953	7.63	−5.22	**2**	−1
Vox (Vox)	2,920	7.55	+6.80	**2**	+2
Citizens–Party of the Citizenry (Cs)	2,097	5.42	−0.64	**1**	±0
We Can–Equo (Podemos–Equo)	1,093	2.82	New	0	±0
Citizens of Lorca (CiudaLor)	634	1.64	New	0	±0
We Are Region (Somos Región)	387	1.00	New	0	±0
Blank ballots	179	0.46	−1.05		
**Total**	**38,693**			**25**	**±0**
Valid votes	38,693	99.44	+1.11		
Invalid votes	219	0.56	−1.11		
**Votes cast / turnout**	**38,912**	**63.82**	**+0.76**		
Abstentions	22,058	36.18	−0.76		
**Registered voters**	**60,970**				

=== Murcia ===
Population: 447,182

← Summary of the 26 May 2019 City Council of Murcia election results →
Parties and alliances	Popular vote			Seats	
Parties and alliances	Votes	%	±pp	Total	+/−
People's Party (PP)	72,612	34.93	−2.63	**11**	−1
Spanish Socialist Workers' Party (PSOE)	60,066	28.89	+9.30	**9**	+3
Citizens–Party of the Citizenry (Cs)	28,013	13.48	−1.96	**4**	−1
Vox (Vox)	21,154	10.18	+8.93	**3**	+3
We Can–Equo (Podemos–Equo)^{1}	13,313	6.40	−2.79	**2**	−1
Let's Change Murcia (United Left–Greens+Anticapitalists) (CM.CR)	4,558	2.19	−6.87	0	−3
We Are Region (Somos Región)	4,070	1.96	New	0	±0
Animalist Party Against Mistreatment of Animals (PACMA)	1,678	0.81	New	0	±0
Communist Party of the Peoples of Spain (PCPE)	390	0.19	−0.38	0	±0
Seniors in Action (3e en acción)	364	0.18	New	0	±0
With You, We Are Democracy (Contigo)	288	0.14	New	0	±0
Democratic Centre Coalition (CCD)	171	0.08	−1.64	0	±0
For a Fairer World (PUM+J)	162	0.08	New	0	±0
Plural Democracy (DPL)	130	0.06	New	0	±0
Internationalist Solidarity and Self-Management (SAIn)	73	0.04	−0.11	0	±0
Blank ballots	837	0.40	−1.18		
**Total**	**207,879**			**29**	**±0**
Valid votes	207,879	99.52	+0.95		
Invalid votes	1,005	0.48	−0.95		
**Votes cast / turnout**	**208,884**	**64.56**	**−0.73**		
Abstentions	114,663	35.44	+0.73		
**Registered voters**	**323,547**				
Sources
Footnotes: ^{1} We Can–Equo results are compared to It is Now Murcia totals in the 2015 election.

== See also ==
- 2019 Murcian regional election
