= Alberto Garre =

Spanish politician

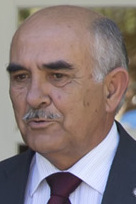

President of the Region of Murcia
- In office 10 April 2014 – 3 July 2015
- Preceded by: Ramón Luis Valcárcel
- Succeeded by: Pedro Antonio Sánchez

Personal details
- Born: Alberto Garre López; 10 February 1952 (age 74) Torre-Pacheco, Spain
- Party: PP (until 2017); Somos Región (2018–2022); Vox (since 2023)

Alberto Garre López (born 10 February 1952) is a Spanish politician who served as President of the Region of Murcia between April 2014 and July 2015. In March 2017, Garre left the People's Party, accusing the then national leader Mariano Rajoy of "inaction on corruption", founding his own party, Somos Región, in February 2018. He currently serves as president of that party.

== Biography ==
Alberto Garre was born in the Pachequera district of Balsicas, where his father worked as a pharmacist. At the age of eighteen months he was orphaned by his mother, who died in an accident.

After studying high school at the Loreto School in Santiago de la Ribera, he studied law at the University of Murcia and after graduating, he began to practice as a lawyer, a profession he did not abandon for many years, combining it with his dedication to politics.

In 1981 he married Susana Cler, and they had two children.

== Political career ==
His political beginnings took place in Torre-Pacheco, his municipality, where he was elected councillor in 1987, being until 1995 spokesman of the municipal group of the Partido Popular, in those years in the opposition in the Town Hall.

In 1991 he was elected a member of the Murcia Regional Assembly for the second constituency (which covers the Campo de Cartagena region), combining this post with that of councillor in Torre Pacheco. In that legislature, he held the position of second secretary of the Bureau of the House. Four years later, in 1995, the People's Party acceded to the government of the Region of Murcia, and he then became spokesman for his parliamentary group in the Regional Assembly, a post he would hold for just over two terms, until 2004, when he was elected deputy for Murcia in Congress.

In the Congress of Deputies he remained for two legislatures, both with the PP in opposition, and in which it was particularly significant the decision he took in 2008 along with the also deputy Murcia Arsenio Pacheco, to break the discipline of the popular group vote in the vote on the reform of the Statute of Autonomy of Castilla-La Mancha, to understand that it violated the interests of the Region of Murcia in water by seeking to end the Tagus-Segura Transfer.

In 2011, he returned to regional politics, again as a deputy in the Regional Assembly, where he was elected first vice president. Local president of the PP in Torre Pacheco, in 2012 he was also appointed as president of the Committee on Rights and Guarantees of the Partido Popular of the Region of Murcia and president of the PP in Torre-Pacheco.

In 2014, after Ramón Luis Valcárcel resigned as President of the Region of Murcia to join the European Parliament, the Regional Executive Board of the Partido Popular elected him "by acclamation "7 on 12 March as Valcárcel's successor. After obtaining the support of the Regional Assembly in the investiture debate, he took office on April 10, 2014.

As President of the Autonomous Community of the Region of Murcia, among other actions, he promoted the limitation of the Presidents' mandates to 8 years and the Law on Transparency. He unblocked the contract with the concessionaire for non-compliance regarding Murcia Region International Airport and set in motion the procedure for awarding the contract again. It agreed on an Employment Pact with the employers and unions and promoted the Drought Decree with the Ministry of Agriculture.

In July 2015, and after the May regional elections, he was relieved of the presidency by Pedro Antonio Sánchez, who had been part of his government as Minister of Education.

In March 2017, he left the Popular Party, accusing its leaders of covering up corruption cases. He specifically cited an instance where the party leaders allowed Pedro Antonio Sánchez to be re-elected as head of the regional party, despite the fact that Sánchez was currently under investigation for corruption. He sent a formal letter of resignation to the party president, Mariano Rajoy, expressing his discontent with the laack of action on corruption and the marginalization of Garre's region.

In June 2017, he established the "Civic Platform for the Region of Murcia" in order to give a voice to citizens who wanted more opportunities to engage with politics.

In April 2018, he founded Somos Región, a regionalist political party with a focus on social reform.
