= 2015 Spanish local elections in the Region of Murcia =

This article presents the results breakdown of the local elections held in the Region of Murcia on 24 May 2015. The following tables show detailed results in the autonomous community's most populous municipalities, sorted alphabetically.

== City control ==
The following table lists party control in the most populous municipalities, including provincial capitals (shown in bold). Gains for a party are displayed with the cell's background shaded in that party's colour.

Municipality	Population	Previous control	New control
Cartagena	216,451	People's Party (PP)	Citizens' Movement of Cartagena (MCC) (PSOE in 2017)
Lorca	91,759	People's Party (PP)	People's Party (PP)
**Murcia**	439,712	People's Party (PP)	People's Party (PP)

== Municipalities ==
=== Cartagena ===
Population: 216,451

← Summary of the 24 May 2015 City Council of Cartagena election results →
Parties and alliances	Popular vote			Seats	
Parties and alliances	Votes	%	±pp	Total	+/−
People's Party (PP)	26,710	30.74	−27.44	**10**	−9
Spanish Socialist Workers' Party (PSOE)	15,498	17.84	+0.35	**6**	+1
Citizens' Movement of Cartagena (MCC)	14,700	16.92	+11.41	**5**	+4
Citizens–Party of the Citizenry (C's)	10,177	11.71	New	**3**	+3
Cartagena Yes We Can (CTSSP)	9,900	11.39	New	**3**	+3
Winning Cartagena–Plural Left (IP–Ganar Cartagena)^{1}	3,024	3.48	−5.11	0	−2
Equo (Equo)	2,294	2.64	New	0	±0
Union, Progress and Democracy (UPyD)	1,489	1.71	−2.37	0	±0
Vox (Vox)	961	1.11	New	0	±0
Cantonal Party (PCAN)	573	0.66	New	0	±0
Blank Seats (EB)	390	0.45	New	0	±0
Blank ballots	1,175	1.35	−0.52		
**Total**	**86,891**			**27**	**±0**
Valid votes	86,891	98.48	−0.28		
Invalid votes	1,341	1.52	+0.28		
**Votes cast / turnout**	**88,232**	**57.84**	**+1.02**		
Abstentions	64,303	42.16	−1.02		
**Registered voters**	**152,535**				
Sources
Footnotes: ^{1} Winning Cartagena.Plural Left results are compared to the combined totals of United Left–Greens of the Region of Murcia and Socialists for Cartagena in the 2011 election.

=== Lorca ===
Population: 91,759

← Summary of the 24 May 2015 City Council of Lorca election results →
Parties and alliances	Popular vote			Seats	
Parties and alliances	Votes	%	±pp	Total	+/−
People's Party (PP)	16,158	44.08	−15.59	**13**	−3
Spanish Socialist Workers' Party (PSOE)	11,186	30.52	+5.04	**8**	+1
United Left–Greens.Plural Left (IU–V.IP)	4,711	12.85	+3.66	**3**	+1
Citizens–Party of the Citizenry (C's)	2,220	6.06	New	**1**	+1
Building the Left–Socialist Alternative (CLI–AS)	724	1.98	New	0	±0
Citizens of Democratic Centre (CCD)	518	1.41	New	0	±0
Union, Progress and Democracy (UPyD)	310	0.85	−1.13	0	±0
Vox (Vox)	275	0.75	New	0	±0
Blank ballots	554	1.51	+0.18		
**Total**	**36,656**			**25**	**±0**
Valid votes	36,656	98.33	−0.72		
Invalid votes	622	1.67	+0.72		
**Votes cast / turnout**	**37,278**	**63.06**	**−2.14**		
Abstentions	21,838	36.94	+2.14		
**Registered voters**	**59,116**				

=== Murcia ===
Population: 439,712

← Summary of the 24 May 2015 City Council of Murcia election results →
Parties and alliances	Popular vote			Seats	
Parties and alliances	Votes	%	±pp	Total	+/−
People's Party (PP)	75,837	37.56	−23.15	**12**	−7
Spanish Socialist Workers' Party (PSOE)	39,552	19.59	+0.11	**6**	±0
Citizens–Party of the Citizenry (C's)	31,174	15.44	New	**5**	+5
It is Now Murcia (Es Ahora Murcia)	18,545	9.19	New	**3**	+3
Let's Change Murcia.Plural Left (Cambiemos Murcia.IP)^{1}	18,288	9.06	+1.26	**3**	+1
Union, Progress and Democracy (UPyD)	5,875	2.91	−3.26	0	−2
Citizens of Democratic Centre (CCD)	3,477	1.72	New	0	±0
Vox (Vox)	2,529	1.25	New	0	±0
Communist Party of the Peoples of Spain (PCPE)	1,142	0.57	New	0	±0
Blank Seats (EB)	1,110	0.55	New	0	±0
Citizens' Democratic Renewal Movement (RED)	569	0.28	New	0	±0
Centre and Democracy Forum (CyD)	313	0.16	−0.02	0	±0
Internationalist Solidarity and Self-Management (SAIn)	293	0.15	New	0	±0
Blank ballots	3,198	1.58	−0.66		
**Total**	**201,902**			**29**	**±0**
Valid votes	201,902	98.57	±0.00		
Invalid votes	2,920	1.43	±0.00		
**Votes cast / turnout**	**204,822**	**65.29**	**−1.73**		
Abstentions	108,884	34.71	+1.73		
**Registered voters**	**313,706**				
Sources
Footnotes: ^{1} Let's Change Murcia.Plural Left results are compared to United Left–Greens of the Region of Murcia totals in the 2011 election.

== See also ==
- 2015 Murcian regional election
