= 2007 Spanish local elections in the Region of Murcia =

This article presents the results breakdown of the local elections held in the Region of Murcia on 27 May 2007. The following tables show detailed results in the autonomous community's most populous municipalities, sorted alphabetically.

== City control ==
The following table lists party control in the most populous municipalities, including provincial capitals (shown in bold). Gains for a party are displayed with the cell's background shaded in that party's colour.

Municipality	Population	Previous control	New control
Cartagena	208,609	People's Party (PP)	People's Party (PP)
Lorca	89,936	Spanish Socialist Workers' Party (PSOE)	People's Party (PP)
**Murcia**	416,996	People's Party (PP)	People's Party (PP)

== Municipalities ==
=== Cartagena ===
Population: 208,609

← Summary of the 27 May 2007 City Council of Cartagena election results →
Parties and alliances	Popular vote			Seats	
Parties and alliances	Votes	%	±pp	Total	+/−
People's Party (PP)	46,258	55.28	−0.42	**16**	±0
Spanish Socialist Workers' Party (PSOE)	25,778	30.80	+0.91	**9**	±0
Citizens' Movement of Cartagena (MCC)	6,308	7.54	+2.33	**2**	+1
United Left+The Greens of the Region of Murcia ((IU+LV)RM)^{1}	3,543	4.23	−3.01	0	−1
Liberal Democratic Centre (CDL)	831	0.99	New	0	±0
Blank ballots	966	1.15	−0.25		
**Total**	**83,684**			**27**	**±0**
Valid votes	83,684	99.49	+0.32		
Invalid votes	427	0.51	−0.32		
**Votes cast / turnout**	**84,111**	**56.17**	**−3.10**		
Abstentions	65,622	43.83	+3.10		
**Registered voters**	**149,733**				
Sources
Footnotes: ^{1} United Left+The Greens of the Region of Murcia results are compared to the combined totals of United Left and The Greens in the 2003 election.

=== Lorca ===
Population: 89,936

← Summary of the 27 May 2007 City Council of Lorca election results →
Parties and alliances	Popular vote			Seats	
Parties and alliances	Votes	%	±pp	Total	+/−
People's Party (PP)	19,432	49.33	+13.33	**13**	+4
Spanish Socialist Workers' Party (PSOE)	15,256	38.73	−16.11	**10**	−4
United Left+The Greens of the Region of Murcia ((IU+LV)RM)	4,134	10.50	+2.55	**2**	±0
Blank ballots	566	1.44	+0.23		
**Total**	**39,388**			**25**	**±0**
Valid votes	39,388	99.35	+0.20		
Invalid votes	257	0.65	−0.20		
**Votes cast / turnout**	**39,645**	**65.34**	**+1.88**		
Abstentions	21,032	34.66	−1.88		
**Registered voters**	**60,677**				
Sources
Footnotes: ^{1} United Left+The Greens of the Region of Murcia results are compared to the combined totals of United Left and The Greens in the 2003 election.

=== Murcia ===
Population: 416,996

← Summary of the 27 May 2007 City Council of Murcia election results →
Parties and alliances	Popular vote			Seats	
Parties and alliances	Votes	%	±pp	Total	+/−
People's Party (PP)	122,213	61.28	+1.22	**19**	±0
Spanish Socialist Workers' Party (PSOE)	59,255	29.71	−0.91	**9**	−1
United Left+The Greens of the Region of Murcia ((IU+LV)RM)^{1}	11,525	5.78	−1.60	**1**	+1
Democratic Union of the Region of Murcia (UDeRM)	1,640	0.82	New	0	±0
Liberal Democratic Centre (CDL)	860	0.43	New	0	±0
For a Fairer World (PUM+J)	500	0.25	New	0	±0
National Democracy (DN)	339	0.17	New	0	±0
Blank ballots	3,094	1.55	−0.40		
**Total**	**199,426**			**29**	**±0**
Valid votes	199,426	99.59	+0.12		
Invalid votes	829	0.41	−0.12		
**Votes cast / turnout**	**200,255**	**66.47**	**−2.92**		
Abstentions	101,033	33.53	+2.92		
**Registered voters**	**301,288**				
Sources
Footnotes: ^{1} United Left+The Greens of the Region of Murcia results are compared to the combined totals of United Left and The Greens in the 2003 election.

== See also ==
- 2007 Murcian regional election
