= 2011 Spanish local elections in the Region of Murcia =

This article presents the results breakdown of the local elections held in the Region of Murcia on 22 May 2011. The following tables show detailed results in the autonomous community's most populous municipalities, sorted alphabetically.

== City control ==
The following table lists party control in the most populous municipalities, including provincial capitals (shown in bold). Gains for a party are displayed with the cell's background shaded in that party's colour.

Municipality	Population	Previous control	New control
Cartagena	214,165	People's Party (PP)	People's Party (PP)
Lorca	92,694	People's Party (PP)	People's Party (PP)
**Murcia**	441,345	People's Party (PP)	People's Party (PP)

== Municipalities ==
=== Cartagena ===
Population: 214,165

← Summary of the 22 May 2011 City Council of Cartagena election results →
Parties and alliances	Popular vote			Seats	
Parties and alliances	Votes	%	±pp	Total	+/−
People's Party (PP)	48,881	58.18	+2.90	**19**	+3
Spanish Socialist Workers' Party (PSOE)	14,692	17.49	−13.31	**5**	−4
United Left–Greens of the Region of Murcia (IU–V–RM)	5,032	5.99	+1.76	**2**	+2
Citizens' Movement of Cartagena (MCC)	4,633	5.51	−2.03	**1**	−1
Union, Progress and Democracy (UPyD)	3,430	4.08	New	0	±0
Socialists for Cartagena (SPCT)	2,188	2.60	New	0	±0
The Greens of the Region of Murcia–Ecolo (LV–Ecolo)	1,024	1.22	New	0	±0
Two Seas Independent Party (PIDM)	757	0.90	New	0	±0
Carthaginense Citizens' Initiative (ICCT)	561	0.67	New	0	±0
Cartagenerist Party (PCt)	367	0.44	New	0	±0
National Democracy (DN)	363	0.43	New	0	±0
Citizens for Blank Votes (CenB)	317	0.38	New	0	±0
Party for the Regeneration of Democracy in Spain (PRDE)	107	0.13	New	0	±0
Employment Business Party (PEE)	95	0.11	New	0	±0
Blank ballots	1,574	1.87	+0.72		
**Total**	**84,021**			**27**	**±0**
Valid votes	84,021	98.76	−0.73		
Invalid votes	1,059	1.24	+0.73		
**Votes cast / turnout**	**85,080**	**56.82**	**+0.65**		
Abstentions	64,648	43.18	−0.65		
**Registered voters**	**149,728**				

=== Lorca ===
Population: 92,694

← Summary of the 22 May 2011 City Council of Lorca election results →
Parties and alliances	Popular vote			Seats	
Parties and alliances	Votes	%	±pp	Total	+/−
People's Party (PP)	22,727	59.67	+10.34	**16**	+3
Spanish Socialist Workers' Party (PSOE)	9,703	25.48	−13.25	**7**	−3
United Left–Greens of the Region of Murcia (IU–V–RM)	3,500	9.19	−1.31	**2**	±0
Union, Progress and Democracy (UPyD)	755	1.98	New	0	±0
Citizens of Lorca (CiudaLor)	730	1.92	New	0	±0
Liberal Democratic Centre (CDL)	165	0.43	New	0	±0
Blank ballots	507	1.33	−0.11		
**Total**	**38,087**			**25**	**±0**
Valid votes	38,087	99.05	−0.30		
Invalid votes	364	0.95	+0.30		
**Votes cast / turnout**	**38,451**	**65.20**	**−0.14**		
Abstentions	20,527	34.80	+0.14		
**Registered voters**	**58,978**				

=== Murcia ===
Population: 441,345

← Summary of the 22 May 2011 City Council of Murcia election results →
Parties and alliances	Popular vote			Seats	
Parties and alliances	Votes	%	±pp	Total	+/−
People's Party (PP)	123,052	60.71	−0.57	**19**	±0
Spanish Socialist Workers' Party (PSOE)	39,489	19.48	−10.23	**6**	−3
United Left–Greens of the Region of Murcia (IU–V–RM)	15,812	7.80	+2.02	**2**	+1
Union, Progress and Democracy (UPyD)	12,506	6.17	New	**2**	+2
The Greens of the Region of Murcia–Ecolo (LV–Ecolo)	2,656	1.31	New	0	±0
The Eco-pacifist Greens (Centristas)	1,413	0.70	New	0	±0
Anti-Bullfighting Party Against Mistreatment of Animals (PACMA)	674	0.33	New	0	±0
Party for the Regeneration of Democracy in Spain (PRDE)	461	0.23	New	0	±0
For a Fairer World (PUM+J)	426	0.21	−0.04	0	±0
Employment Business Party (PEE)	398	0.20	New	0	±0
Liberal Democratic Centre (CDL)	374	0.18	−0.25	0	±0
Centre and Democracy Forum (CyD)	372	0.18	New	0	±0
Renewed United Democratic Centre (CDUR)	340	0.17	New	0	±0
Communist Unification of Spain (UCE)	173	0.09	New	0	±0
Blank ballots	4,540	2.24	+0.69		
**Total**	**202,686**			**29**	**±0**
Valid votes	202,686	98.57	−1.02		
Invalid votes	2,933	1.43	+1.02		
**Votes cast / turnout**	**205,619**	**67.02**	**+0.55**		
Abstentions	101,190	32.98	−0.55		
**Registered voters**	**306,809**				

== See also ==
- 2011 Murcian regional election
