= 2023 Spanish local elections in the Region of Murcia =

This article presents the results breakdown of the local elections held in the Region of Murcia on 26 May 2019. The following tables show detailed results in the autonomous community's most populous municipalities, sorted alphabetically.

== City control ==
The following table lists party control in the most populous municipalities, including provincial capitals (shown in bold). Gains for a party are displayed with the cell's background shaded in that party's colour.

Municipality	Population	Previous control	New control
Cartagena	216,961	People's Party (PP)	People's Party (PP)
Lorca	97,151	Spanish Socialist Workers' Party (PSOE)	People's Party (PP)
**Murcia**	462,979	Spanish Socialist Workers' Party (PSOE)	People's Party (PP)

== Municipalities ==
=== Cartagena ===
Population: 216,961

← Summary of the 28 May 2023 City Council of Cartagena election results →
Parties and alliances	Popular vote			Seats	
Parties and alliances	Votes	%	±pp	Total	+/−
People's Party (PP)	31,972	34.32	+8.85	**10**	+3
Citizens' Movement of Cartagena (MCC)	23,947	25.71	−1.73	**8**	±0
Spanish Socialist Workers' Party (PSOE)	12,294	13.20	−8.47	**4**	−2
Vox (Vox)	11,753	12.62	+4.66	**4**	+2
Yes Cartagena (Sí Cartagena)	5,074	5.45	New	**1**	+1
We Can–United Left Greens–Green Alliance (Podemos–IUV–AV)	3,705	3.98	−2.95	0	−2
More Cartagena–Greens Equo (MR–VE)	1,207	1.30	New	0	±0
Citizens–Party of the Citizenry (CS)	1,056	1.13	−7.06	0	−2
Cartagenerist Party (PCt)	410	0.44	New	0	±0
Cantonal Party (PCAN)	300	0.32	−0.04	0	±0
Blank Seats to Leave Empty Seats (EB)	291	0.31	New	0	±0
Independents for Cartagena (InxCart)	235	0.25	New	0	±0
For My Region (Por Mi Región)^{1}	110	0.12	−0.98	0	±0
With You, We Are Democracy (Contigo)	106	0.11	−0.14	0	±0
Blank ballots	691	0.74	+0.28		
**Total**	**93,151**			**27**	**±0**
Valid votes	93,151	99.15	−0.35		
Invalid votes	794	0.85	+0.35		
**Votes cast / turnout**	**93,945**	**60.11**	**+3.03**		
Abstentions	62,352	39.89	−3.03		
**Registered voters**	**156,297**				
Sources
Footnotes: ^{1} For My Region results are compared to We Are Region totals in the 2019 election.

=== Lorca ===
Population: 97,151

← Summary of the 28 May 2023 City Council of Lorca election results →
Parties and alliances	Popular vote			Seats	
Parties and alliances	Votes	%	±pp	Total	+/−
People's Party (PP)	16,622	40.93	+3.53	**11**	+1
Spanish Socialist Workers' Party (PSOE)	13,588	33.46	−2.61	**9**	−1
Vox (Vox)	6,935	17.08	+9.53	**4**	+2
United Left Greens–We Can–Green Alliance (IUV–Podemos–AV)^{1}	2,171	5.35	−5.10	**1**	−1
Greens Equo–More Lorca (MR–VE)	362	0.89	New	0	±0
Citizens–Party of the Citizenry (CS)	333	0.82	−4.60	0	−1
Values (Valores)	213	0.52	New	0	±0
Blank ballots	386	0.95	+0.49		
**Total**	**40,610**			**25**	**±0**
Valid votes	40,610	99.03	−0.41		
Invalid votes	398	0.97	+0.41		
**Votes cast / turnout**	**41,008**	**66.24**	**+2.42**		
Abstentions	20,900	33.76	−2.42		
**Registered voters**	**61,908**				
Sources
Footnotes: ^{1} United Left Greens–We Can–Green Alliance results are compared to the combined totals of United Left–Greens Lorca.Change the Region of Murcia and We Can–Equo in the 2019 election.

=== Murcia ===
Population: 462,979

← Summary of the 28 May 2023 City Council of Murcia election results →
Parties and alliances	Popular vote			Seats	
Parties and alliances	Votes	%	±pp	Total	+/−
People's Party (PP)	98,888	45.36	+10.43	**15**	+4
Spanish Socialist Workers' Party (PSOE)	53,024	24.32	−4.57	**8**	−1
Vox (Vox)	40,887	18.75	+8.57	**6**	+3
We Can–United Left Greens–Green Alliance (Podemos–IU–AV)^{1}	9,913	4.55	−4.04	0	−2
Green Coalition (MR–VE)	3,882	1.78	New	0	±0
Citizens–Party of the Citizenry (CS)	3,760	1.72	−11.76	0	−4
Hi Hamlets (HoPe)	2,394	1.10	New	0	±0
For My Region (Por Mi Región)^{2}	941	0.43	−1.53	0	±0
Free Murcia (ML)	613	0.28	New	0	±0
Seniors in Action (3e)	593	0.27	+0.09	0	±0
Values (Valores)	501	0.23	New	0	±0
Communist Party of the Peoples of Spain (PCPE)	401	0.18	−0.01	0	±0
Blank ballots	2,219	1.02	+0.62		
**Total**	**218,016**			**29**	**±0**
Valid votes	218,016	98.93	−0.59		
Invalid votes	2,349	1.07	+0.59		
**Votes cast / turnout**	**220,365**	**66.12**	**−1.56**		
Abstentions	112,919	33.88	+1.56		
**Registered voters**	**333,284**				
Sources
Footnotes: ^{1} We Can–United Left Greens–Green Alliance results are compared to the combined totals of We Can–Equo and Let's Change Murcia in the 2019 election.; ^{2} For My Region results are compared to We Are Region totals in the 2019 election.

== See also ==
- 2023 Murcian regional election
