= Macarena Olona =

Spanish politician (born 1979)

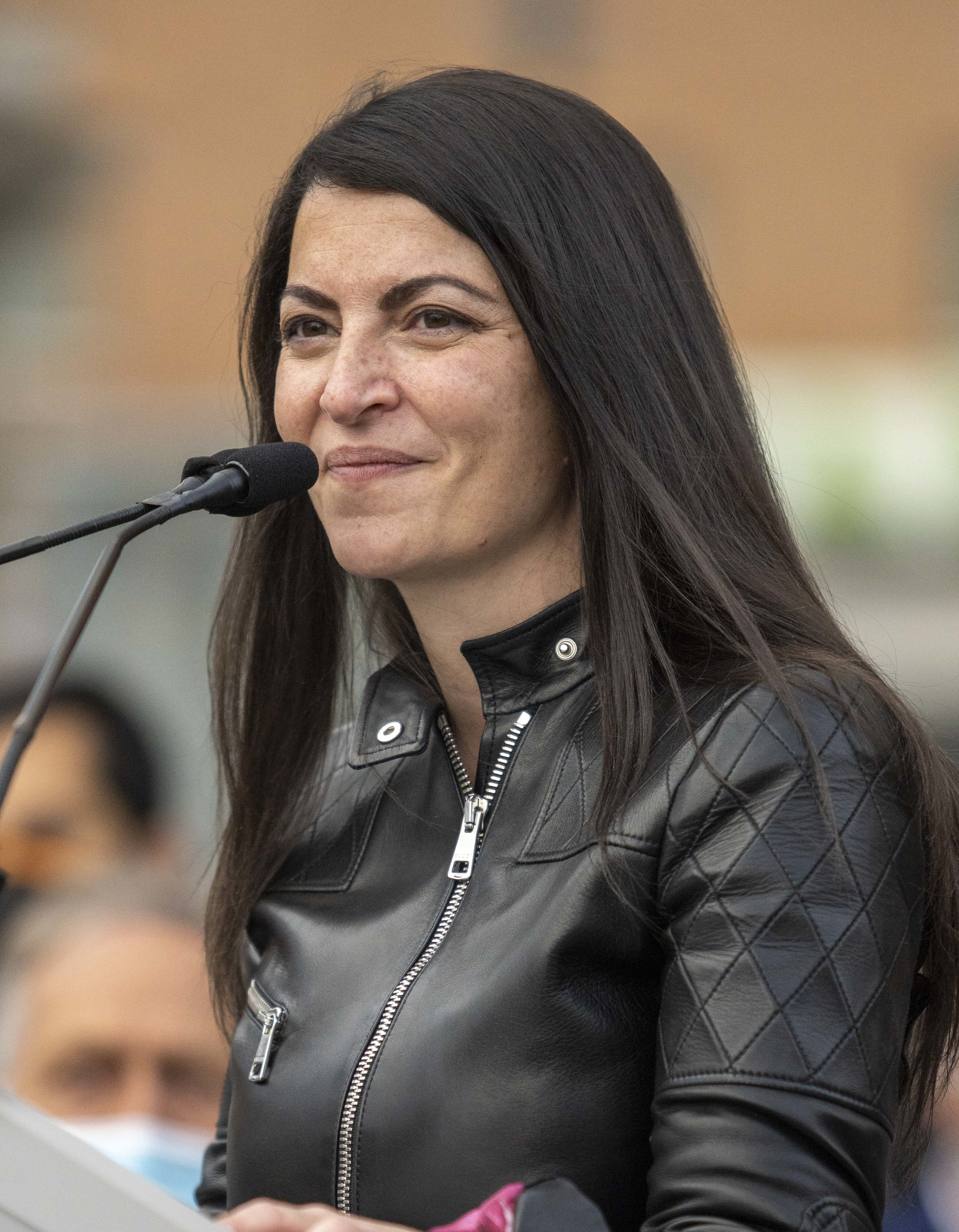
- Macarena Olona in April 2021

Member of the Congress of Deputies
- In office 21 May 2019 – 1 July 2022
- Constituency: Granada

Member of the Parliament of Andalusia
- In office 14 July 2022 – 31 July 2022
- Constituency: Granada

Personal details
- Born: 14 May 1979 (age 47) Alicante, Spain
- Party: Caminando Juntos (since 2023)
- Other political affiliations: Vox (2019–2022)
- Children: 1
- Education: University of Alicante

Macarena Olona Choclán (born 14 May 1979) is a Spanish politician and state attorney. Olona was member of the Congress of Deputies between 2019 and 2022 for Vox, before being allegedly involved in an internal feud that led to her expulsion from the party.

== Early life and career ==
Born in Alicante, Olona graduated in Laws for the University of Alicante in 2003 with extraordinary prize and entered the State Lawyers Corps in 2009. Between 2013 and 2018, she was chief lawyer of the state of the Basque Country. Transferred to the Sociedad Estatal de Participaciones Industriales as general secretary in August 2017, the following year she collaborated in uncovering the Mercasa case that involved both the People's Party (PP) and the Spanish Socialist Workers' Party (PSOE) in the payment of millionaire bites and cost overruns of more than 300% in foreign contracts.

In the April 2019 Spanish general election, Olona was elected deputy and then re-elected in the November 2019 Spanish general election, representing in both cases the province of Granada. She is known for her virulent criticism of the government of Pedro Sánchez, accusing it of "genocide" for its management of the COVID-19 pandemic in Spain or of wanting to impose the Venezuelan "Chavist model" in Spain. She favours establishing a government of "national salvation" involving the army. She is opposed to laws on LGBT or gender violence.

In 2022, Olona was appointed by Vox as the presidential candidate for the 2022 Andalusian regional election. Even though the party won 2 seats more and 100,000 votes, it lost 400,000 compared to the party's result in the November 2019 general election. Days after the constitution of the 12th Parliament of Andalusia on 14 July 2022, her retirement from politics "due to health issues" was announced. In 2023, she announced the founding of a new political party, Caminando Juntos (Walking Together), which she led in the 2023 Spanish general election scheduled for 23 July.

== Personal life ==
Granddaughter of businessman Felipe Choclán, Olona was one of the richest members of Congress. On 12 March 2020, during the COVID-19 pandemic, it was confirmed she had tested positive for SARS-CoV-2.
