= Citizens' Convergence of the South-East =

Citizens Convergence of the South-East (C.C.SE.) (in Spanish: Convergencia Ciudadana del Sureste) is a political party in Cartagena, Spain. C.C.SE. wants to create a new autonomous region in the South-Eastern region of Spain. CCSE claims that there is a lack of collective identity towards the current regional division and the community of Murcia.

C.C.SE. was a 2011 restructuring of the Unión Democrática de la Región de Murcia (UDeRM), who had some success in electing members to the city council in Alhama de Murcia.

CCSE has published the magazine Calamarí.

In the national parliamentary elections for the Congress of Deputies seat for Murcia, CCSE got 645 votes (0.10%) in 2000 and 308 votes (0.04%) in 2004.

As of 2015, the Secretary General of the party was José Antonio Gallego, who was also one of the founding members, and ran for Cartagena city council with the political party Equo.
