= Caminando Juntos =

Walking Together Caminando Juntos
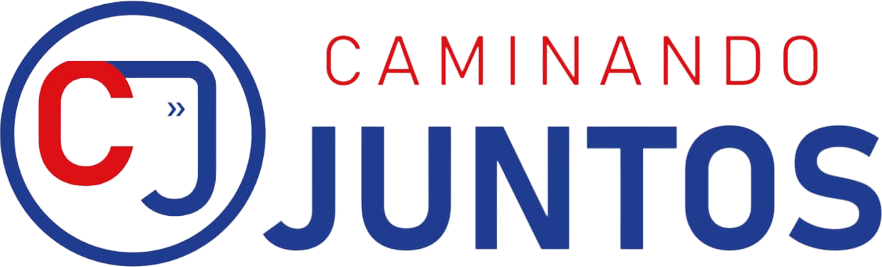
- Abbreviation: CJ
- President: Macarena Olona
- Vice President: Rosario Velasco
- Secretary-General: Marisol Camacho
- Founder: Macarena Olona
- Founded: 8 June 2023
- Split from: Vox
- Ideology: Direct democracy Anti-establishment; Populism
- Political position: Syncretic
- Colours: Blue; Red
- Slogan: «In Spain there is another way» (Spanish: «En España hay otro camino»)
- Congress of Deputies: 0 / 350
- Senate: 0 / 265

Website
- caminando-juntos.org

Caminando Juntos (CJ; English: Walking Together) is a Spanish political party founded by former Vox deputy Macarena Olona.

== History ==
=== Background ===
The party was founded by Macarena Olona, a former member of the, national conservative party Vox. Olona served as a member of the Spanish Congress of Deputies following the April 2019 general election, and was elected as a member of the Parliament of Andalusia following the 2022 Andalusian regional election in which she was the party's lead candidate for the Presidency of the regional government.

Days after the investiture of the newly elected Andalusian Parliament, Olona announced her retirement from politics, citing "health reasons". It has also been alleged that she was part of an internal feud within Vox and had poor relations with the party's national leadership, which led to her departure from Vox. She would announce her new political project 11 months later to contest the July 2023 Spanish general election.

=== Foundation ===
The party was legally registered on 31 May 2023 by the Spanish Interior Ministry.

Party leader Macarena Olona confirmed on 1 June 2023 that her Caminando Juntos political party would stand in the 2023 Spanish general election and that she, as candidate, will head the list for the province of Granada. The party contested in ten provinces and did not obtain any representation.

== Electoral performance ==
Cortes Generales
Election	Leading candidate	Congress				Senate		Government
Election	Leading candidate	Votes	%	Seats	+/–	Seats	+/–	Government
2023	Macarena Olona	5,620	0.02	0 / 350	New	0 / 208	New	Extra-parliamentary
