= For My Region =

For My Region Por Mi Región
- President: Pilar García Santos
- Founded: 21 February 2018
- Split from: People's Party
- Headquarters: C/ San Francisco 3, bajo 30002, Murcia
- Ideology: Murcian regionalism
- Political position: Centre-right
- Regional Assembly of Murcia: 0 / 45
- Local seats (2019-2023): 4 / 769

Website
- pormiregion.es

For My Region (Spanish: Por Mi Región), previously known as We Are Region (Spanish: Somos Región), is a regionalist political party in the Region of Murcia, launched in February 2018 as a split from the ruling People's Party by former President of the Region of Murcia Alberto Garre.

== Electoral performance ==
=== Regional Assembly of Murcia ===
Election	Votes	%	Seats	+/–	Government
2019	13,373	2.0 (#7)	0 / 45	0	Extra-parliamentary
2023	2,379	0.4 (#9)	0 / 45	0	Extra-parliamentary
