= 1987 Murcian regional election =

Election in the Spanish region of Murcia

- 10 June 1987

All 45 seats in the Regional Assembly of Murcia 23 seats needed for a majority
- Opinion polls
- Registered: 702,068 ▲4.0%
- Turnout: 512,361 (73.0%) ▲4.5 pp
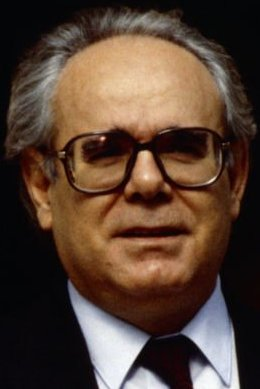

	First party	Second party	Third party
Leader	Carlos Collado	Antonio Cerdá	Ángel González
Party	PSOE	AP	CDS
Leader since	31 March 1984	1987	1987
Leader's seat	Three	Three	Three
Last election	26 seats, 52.2%	16 seats, 35.4% (Note: Results for AP–PDP–UL in the 1983 election.)	0 seats, 1.1%
Seats won	25	16	3
Seat change	▼1	0	▲3
Popular vote	221,377	159,566	60,406
Percentage	43.7%	31.5%	11.9%
Swing	▼8.5 pp	▼3.9 pp	▲10.8 pp
	Fourth party
Leader	Pedro Antonio Ríos
Party	IU
Leader since	1983
Leader's seat	Three
Last election	1 seat, 7.0% (Note: Results for the PCE in the 1983 election.)
Seats won	1
Seat change	0
Popular vote	37,708
Percentage	7.4%
Swing	▲0.4 pp
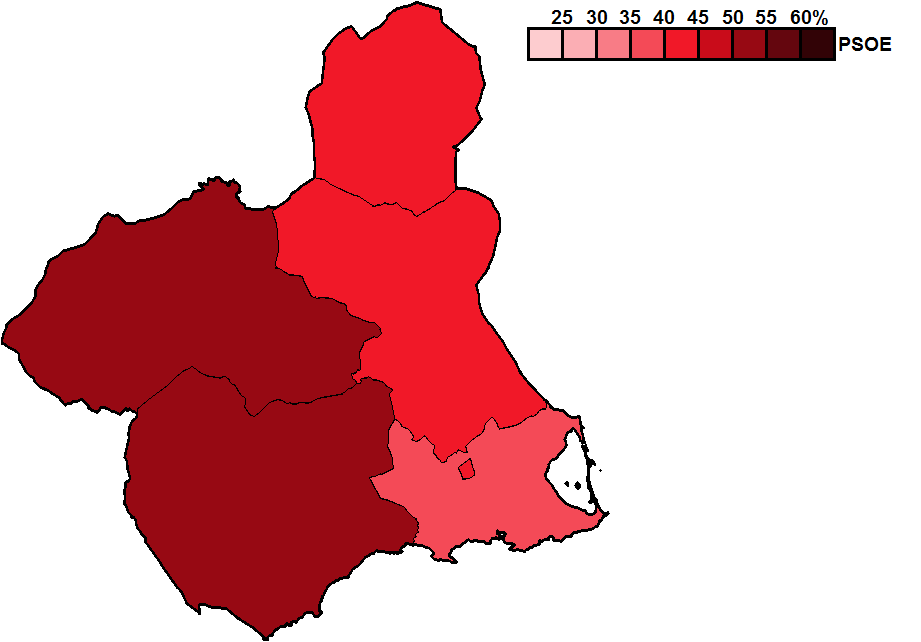
- Constituency results map for the Regional Assembly of Murcia
President before election
Carlos Collado
PSOE
Elected President
Carlos Collado
PSOE

A regional election was held in the Region of Murcia on 10 June 1987 to elect the 2nd Regional Assembly of the autonomous community. All 45 seats in the Regional Assembly were up for election. It was held concurrently with regional elections in twelve other autonomous communities and local elections all across Spain, as well as the 1987 European Parliament election.

Against predictions throughout the campaign that it might lose its absolute majority in the Regional Assembly, the Spanish Socialist Workers' Party (PSOE) emerged as the largest party with 25 out of 45 seats, but lost nearly 9 percentage points compared to 1983, after falling from over 52% to just below 44%. The People's Alliance (AP) ran on its own after the dissolution of the People's Coalition. While its former allies—the People's Democratic Party (PDP) and the Liberal Party (PL)—did not contest the regional election, AP lost ground to former Spanish Prime Minister Adolfo Suárez's Democratic and Social Centre (CDS), which entered the Assembly with 11.9% of the share and 3 seats. The Communist-led United Left coalition (IU) held its ground, obtaining 1 seat with 7.4% of the share.

PSOE candidate Carlos Collado, who had accessed power in 1984 after the resignation of former regional premier Andrés Hernández Ros, was re-elected as President of the Region of Murcia for his first full-term in office.

== Overview ==
=== Electoral system ===
The Regional Assembly of Murcia was the devolved, unicameral legislature of the autonomous community of Murcia, having legislative power in regional matters as defined by the Spanish Constitution and the Murcian Statute of Autonomy, as well as the ability to vote confidence in or withdraw it from a regional president.

Voting for the Regional Assembly was on the basis of universal suffrage, which comprised all nationals over 18 years of age, registered in the Region of Murcia and in full enjoyment of their political rights. The 45 members of the Regional Assembly of Murcia were elected using the D'Hondt method and a closed list proportional representation, with an electoral threshold of five percent of valid votes—which included blank ballots—being applied regionally. Seats were allocated to constituencies, which were established by law as follows:

- District One (comprising the municipalities of Lorca, Aguilas, Puerto Lumbreras, Totana, Alhama de Murcia, Librilla, Aledo and Mazarrón).
- District Two (comprising the municipalities of Cartagena, La Unión, Fuente Alamo de Murcia, Torre-Pacheco, San Javier, San Pedro del Pinatar and Los Alcázares).
- District Three (comprising the municipalities of Murcia, Alcantarilla, Beniel, Molina de Segura, Alguazas, Las Torres de Cotillas, Lorquí, Ceutí, Cieza, Abarán, Blanca, Archena, Ricote, Ulea, Villanueva del Río Segura, Ojós, Fortuna, Abanilla and Santomera).
- District Four (comprising the municipalities of Caravaca, Cehegín, Calasparra, Moratalla, Bullas, Pliego, Mula, Albudeite and Campos del Río).
- District Five (comprising the municipalities of Yecla and Jumilla).

Each constituency was entitled to an initial minimum of one seat, with the remaining 40 allocated among the constituencies in proportion to their populations.

=== Election date ===
The term of the Regional Assembly of Murcia expired four years after the date of its previous election. The election decree was required to be issued no later than the twenty-fifth day prior to the expiration date of parliament and published on the following day in the Official Gazette of the Region of Murcia, with election day taking place between the fifty-fourth and the sixtieth day from publication and set so as to make it coincide with elections to the regional assemblies of other autonomous communities. The previous election was held on 8 May 1983, which meant that the legislature's term would have expired on 8 May 1987. The election decree was required to be published no later than 14 April 1987, with the election taking place no later than the sixtieth day from publication, setting the latest possible election date for the Regional Assembly on 13 June 1987.

The Regional Assembly of Murcia could not be dissolved before the expiration date of parliament except in the event of an investiture process failing to elect a regional president within a two-month period from the first ballot. In such a case, the Regional Assembly was to be automatically dissolved and a snap election called, with elected lawmakers serving the remainder of its original four-year term.

== Parties and candidates ==
The electoral law allowed for parties and federations registered in the interior ministry, coalitions and groupings of electors to present lists of candidates. Parties and federations intending to form a coalition ahead of an election were required to inform the relevant Electoral Commission within ten days of the election call, whereas groupings of electors needed to secure the signature of at least one percent of the electorate in the Region of Murcia, disallowing electors from signing for more than one list of candidates.

Below is a list of the main parties and electoral alliances which contested the election:

Candidacy	Parties and alliances	Leading candidate	Ideology	Previous result		Gov.	Ref.
Candidacy	Parties and alliances	Leading candidate	Ideology	Vote %	Seats	Gov.	Ref.
PSOE	List: Spanish Socialist Workers' Party (PSOE)	Carlos Collado	Social democracy	52.2%	26	Yes	
AP	List: People's Party (AP)	Antonio Cerdá	Conservatism	35.4%	16	No	
IU	List: United Left (IU)	Pedro Antonio Ríos	Socialism; Communism	7.0%	1	No	
CDS	List: Democratic and Social Centre (CDS)	Ángel González	Centrism; Liberalism	1.1%	0	No	

== Opinion polls ==
The table below lists voting intention estimates in reverse chronological order, showing the most recent first and using the dates when the survey fieldwork was done, as opposed to the date of publication. Where the fieldwork dates are unknown, the date of publication is given instead. The highest percentage figure in each polling survey is displayed with its background shaded in the leading party's colour. If a tie ensues, this is applied to the figures with the highest percentages. The "Lead" column on the right shows the percentage-point difference between the parties with the highest percentages in a poll. When available, seat projections determined by the polling organisations are displayed below (or in place of) the percentages in a smaller font; 23 seats were required for an absolute majority in the Regional Assembly of Murcia.

Polling firm/Commissioner	Fieldwork date	Sample size	Turnout	PSOE	AP–PDP–PL	IU	CDS	AP	PDP	Lead
1987 regional election	10 Jun 1987	—N/a	69.9	43.7; 25	–	7.4; 1	11.9; 3	31.5; 16	–	12.2
Demoscopia/El País	22–26 May 1987	?	72	41.9; 21/22	–	5.8; 1	16.1; 6/7	33.5; 16	1.2; 0	8.4
Sofemasa/AP	16 Apr 1987	?	?	39.6	–	1.0	8.6	31.0	–	8.6
1986 general election	22 Jun 1986	—N/a	73.9	48.8	34.3	4.5	8.3	(Note: Within CP.)		14.5
1983 regional election	8 May 1983	—N/a	68.5	52.2; 26	35.4; 16	7.0 (Note: Result for PCE.); 1	1.1; 0			16.8

== Results ==
=== Overall ===
← Summary of the 10 June 1987 Regional Assembly of Murcia election results →
Parties and alliances	Popular vote			Seats	
Parties and alliances	Votes	%	±pp	Total	+/−
Spanish Socialist Workers' Party (PSOE)	221,377	43.71	−8.52	25	−1
People's Alliance (AP)^{1}	159,566	31.51	−3.91	16	±0
Democratic and Social Centre (CDS)	60,406	11.93	+10.79	3	+3
United Left (IU)^{2}	37,708	7.45	+0.43	1	±0
Cantonal Party (PCAN)	17,207	3.40	+0.57	0	±0
Murcian Regionalist Party (PRM)	1,962	0.39	New	0	±0
Workers' Party of Spain–Communist Unity (PTE–UC)	1,914	0.38	New	0	±0
Humanist Platform (PH)	1,431	0.28	New	0	±0
Blank ballots	4,862	0.96	+0.39		
Total	506,433			45	+2
Valid votes	506,433	98.84	−0.15		
Invalid votes	5,928	1.16	+0.15		
Votes cast / turnout	512,361	72.98	+4.51		
Abstentions	189,707	27.02	−4.51		
Registered voters	702,068				
Sources
Footnotes: ^{1} People's Alliance results are compared to People's Coalition totals in the 1983 election.; ^{2} United Left results are compared to Communist Party of Spain totals in the 1983 election.

Popular vote
PSOE	43.71%
AP	31.51%
CDS	11.93%
IU	7.45%
PCAN	3.40%
Others	1.05%
Blank ballots	0.96%

Seats
PSOE	55.56%
AP	35.56%
CDS	6.67%
IU	2.22%

=== Distribution by constituency ===
Constituency	PSOE		AP		CDS		IU	
Constituency	%	S	%	S	%	S	%	S
One	52.3	5	26.1	2	10.2	−	9.3	−
Two	37.6	5	27.6	4	12.4	1	5.3	−
Three	41.9	9	35.9	8	12.3	2	7.5	1
Four	54.5	4	25.2	1	13.5	−	5.9	−
Five	42.6	2	32.7	1	9.1	−	13.6	−
Total	43.7	25	31.5	16	11.9	3	7.4	1

== Aftermath ==
Investiture; Carlos Collado (PSOE)
Ballot →	20 July 1987
Required majority →	23 out of 45
Yes: • PSOE (25)	25 / 45
No: • AP (16); • IU (1)	17 / 45
Abstentions: • CDS (2)	2 / 45
Absentees: • CDS (1)	1 / 45
