= 1983 Murcian regional election =

Election in the Spanish region of Murcia

- 8 May 1983

All 43 seats in the Regional Assembly of Murcia 22 seats needed for a majority
- Opinion polls
- Registered: 675,082
- Turnout: 462,212 (68.5%)

	First party	Second party	Third party
Leader	Andrés Hernández Ros	José Lucas	Pedro Antonio Ríos
Party	PSOE	AP–PDP–PL	PCE
Leader since	1978	1983	1983
Leader's seat	Three	Three	Three
Seats won	26	16	1
Popular vote	238,968	162,074	32,113
Percentage	52.2%	35.4%	7.0%
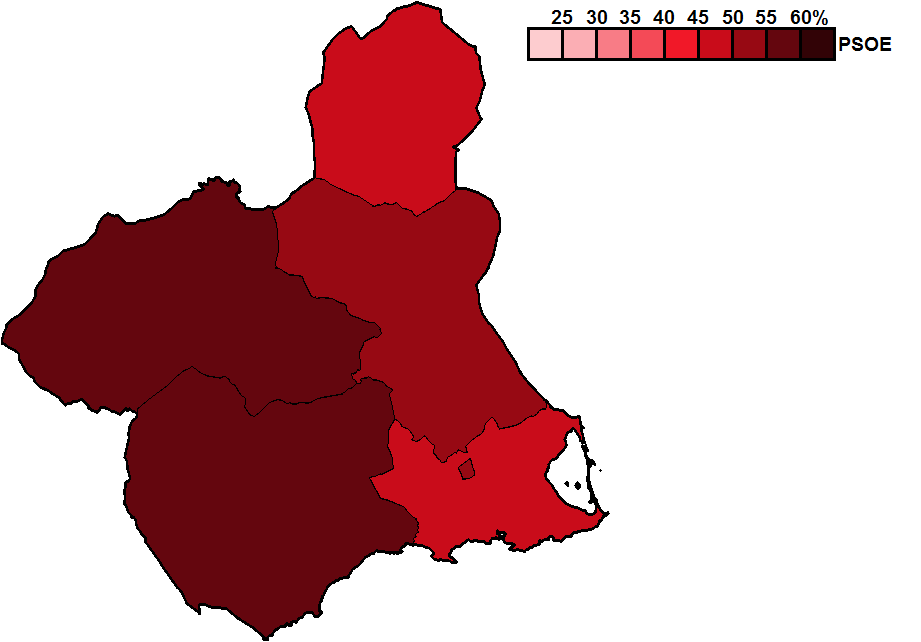
- Constituency results map for the Regional Assembly of Murcia
President before election
Andrés Hernández Ros
PSOE
Elected President
Andrés Hernández Ros
PSOE

A regional election was held in the Region of Murcia on 8 May 1983 to elect the 1st Regional Assembly of the autonomous community. All 43 seats in the Regional Assembly were up for election. It was held concurrently with regional elections in twelve other autonomous communities and local elections all across Spain.

The Spanish Socialist Workers' Party (PSOE) won the election with a landslide victory, securing an absolute majority in both seats and votes. The People's Coalition, an electoral alliance led by the right-wing People's Alliance (AP) and including the People's Democratic Party (PDP) and the Liberal Union (UL), became the second political force, whereas the Communist Party of Spain (PCE) entered the Assembly with 1 seat. Despite initial expectations and high opinion poll results, as well as a strong performance in the Campo de Cartagena area with over 12%, the Cantonal Party (PCAN) remained an extra-parliamentary political force due to it failing to reach the 5% regional threshold. The former ruling party of Spain, the Union of the Democratic Centre (UCD), had chosen to dissolve itself in February 1983 and did not contest the election as a result.

As a result of the election, PSOE candidate Andrés Hernández Ros, who had led the pre-autonomic regional government since 1979, renewed his post as president of the Region of Murcia. His hold in power weakened over political disagreements with his own party throughout the ensuing months, he would resign in March 1984 after a scandal erupted amid accusations of attempted bribery of two journalists from the La Verdad newspaper, being succeeded as president by Carlos Collado.

== Overview ==
=== Electoral system ===
The Regional Assembly of Murcia was the devolved, unicameral legislature of the autonomous community of Murcia, having legislative power in regional matters as defined by the Spanish Constitution and the Murcian Statute of Autonomy, as well as the ability to vote confidence in or withdraw it from a regional president.

Transitory Provision First of the Statute established a specific electoral procedure for the first election to the Regional Assembly of Murcia, to be supplemented by the provisions within Royal Decree-Law 20/1977, of 18 March, and its related regulations. Voting for the Regional Assembly was on the basis of universal suffrage, which comprised all nationals over 18 years of age, registered in the Region of Murcia and in full enjoyment of their political rights. The 43 members of the Regional Assembly of Murcia were elected using the D'Hondt method and a closed list proportional representation, with an electoral threshold of five percent of valid votes—which included blank ballots—being applied regionally. Seats were allocated to constituencies, which were established by law as follows:

- District One (comprising the municipalities of Lorca, Aguilas, Puerto Lumbreras, Totana, Alhama de Murcia, Librilla, Aledo and Mazarrón).
- District Two (comprising the municipalities of Cartagena, La Unión, Fuente Alamo de Murcia, Torre-Pacheco, San Javier, San Pedro del Pinatar and Los Alcázares).
- District Three (comprising the municipalities of Murcia, Alcantarilla, Beniel, Molina de Segura, Alguazas, Las Torres de Cotillas, Lorquí, Ceutí, Cieza, Abarán, Blanca, Archena, Ricote, Ulea, Villanueva del Río Segura, Ojós, Fortuna, Abanilla and Santomera).
- District Four (comprising the municipalities of Caravaca, Cehegín, Calasparra, Moratalla, Bullas, Pliego, Mula, Albudeite and Campos del Río).
- District Five (comprising the municipalities of Yecla and Jumilla).

Each constituency was allocated a fixed number of seats: 7 for District One, 10 for District Two, 19 for District Three, 4 for District Four and 3 for District Five.

=== Election date ===
The Council of Government of the Region, in agreement with the Government of Spain, was required to call an election to the Regional Assembly of Murcia within from 1 February to 31 May 1983. On 7 March 1983, it was confirmed that the first election to the Regional Assembly of Murcia would be held on 8 May, together with regional elections for twelve other autonomous communities as well as nationwide local elections, with the election decree being published in the Official Gazette of the Region of Murcia (BORM) on 10 March.

== Background ==
Autonomy for the Region of Murcia had its groots in the "Floridablanca Pact" of 29 January 1978, when both the Union of the Democratic Centre (UCD) and the Spanish Socialist Workers' Party (PSOE) had agreed for the establishment of a "Working Body" made up of 18 members from the political parties in the region with representation in the Cortes Generales to draft a pre-autonomy statute; within days, a plenary of parliamentarians was established. Negotiations with the Spanish government ensued, resulting in a pre-autonomic regime for the region being granted in October 1978. The first regional government was formed by members from both the UCD and PSOE, with UCD's Antonio Pérez Crespo at its helm. The election victories of the PSOE at the 1979 general and local elections brought about a change in the parliamentary composition of the regional council, with Socialist Andrés Hernández Ros becoming new regional president on 5 May 1979.

The approval of the regional Statute of Autonomy for the Region of Murcia was subject to the "slow-track" procedure set down under Article 143 of the Constitution, with the support of both UCD and PSOE. The regional government formally applied for autonomy under the Article 143 procedure on 14 June 1980, with local councils in the region joining the initiative shortly thereafter. A process ensued throughout the ensuing months in which a statute bill was drafted and subsequently approved on 23 March 1981, to be sent to the Cortes Generales for its final ratification, delayed until June 1982 as a result of amendments being introduced by both the Congress of Deputies and the Senate. Concurrently, the UCD and PSOE negotiated the abolition of the Provincial Council and its absorption into the newly-established autonomous community, but attempts for a national unity government to make up the first autonomic government failed, with the PSOE leading a single-party government instead. Hernández Ros and Carlos Collado were elected in July 1982 as the regional president and the Regional Assembly's speaker, respectively, to remain in the posts until the first regional election was held.

== Parties and candidates ==
The electoral law allowed for parties and federations registered in the interior ministry, coalitions and groupings of electors to present lists of candidates. Parties and federations intending to form a coalition ahead of an election were required to inform the relevant Electoral Commission within fifteen days of the election call, whereas groupings of electors needed to secure the signature of at least one-thousandth of the electorate in the constituencies for which they sought election—with a compulsory minimum of 500 signatures—disallowing electors from signing for more than one list of candidates.

Below is a list of the main parties and electoral alliances which contested the election:

Candidacy	Parties and alliances	Leading candidate	Ideology	Gov.	Ref.
PSOE	List: Spanish Socialist Workers' Party (PSOE)	Andrés Hernández Ros	Social democracy	Yes	
AP–PDP–UL	List: People's Alliance (AP); People's Democratic Party (PDP); Liberal Union (UL)	José Lucas	Conservatism; Christian democracy	No	
PCE	List: Communist Party of Spain (PCE)	Pedro Antonio Ríos	Eurocommunism	No	

The electoral disaster of the Union of the Democratic Centre (UCD) in the October 1982 general election and the outcome of its extraordinary congress held in December, in which the party's leadership chose to transform the UCD into a christian democratic political force, brought the party to a process of virtual disintegration as many of its remaining members either switched party allegiances, split into new, independent candidacies or left politics altogether. Subsequent attempts to seek electoral allies ahead of the incoming 1983 local and regional elections, mainly the conservative People's Alliance (AP) and the christian democratic People's Democratic Party (PDP), had limited success due to concerns from both AP and UCD over such an alliance policy: AP strongly rejected any agreement that implied any sort of global coalition with UCD due to the party's ongoing decomposition, and prospects about a possible PDP–UCD merger did not come into fruition because of the latter's reluctance to dilute its brand within another party. By the time the UCD's executive had voted for the liquidation of the party's mounting debts and its subsequent dissolution on 18 February 1983, electoral alliances with the AP–PDP coalition had only been agreed in some provinces of the Basque Country and Galicia.

Together with AP, the PDP had agreed to maintain their general election alliance—now rebranded as the People's Coalition—for the May local and regional elections, with the inclusion of the Liberal Union (UL), a political party created in January 1983 out of independents from the AP–PDP coalition in an attempt to appeal to former UCD liberal voters. The Coalition had seen its numbers soar from late February as a result of many former members from the UCD's christian democratic wing joining the PDP.

== Opinion polls ==
The table below lists voting intention estimates in reverse chronological order, showing the most recent first and using the dates when the survey fieldwork was done, as opposed to the date of publication. Where the fieldwork dates are unknown, the date of publication is given instead. The highest percentage figure in each polling survey is displayed with its background shaded in the leading party's colour. If a tie ensues, this is applied to the figures with the highest percentages. The "Lead" column on the right shows the percentage-point difference between the parties with the highest percentages in a poll. When available, seat projections determined by the polling organisations are displayed below (or in place of) the percentages in a smaller font; 22 seats were required for an absolute majority in the Regional Assembly of Murcia.

Polling firm/Commissioner	Fieldwork date	Sample size	Turnout	PSOE	AP–PDP–UL	PCE	PCAN	Lead
1983 regional election	8 May 1983	—N/a	68.5	52.2; 26	35.4; 16	7.0; 1	2.8; 0	16.8
Sofemasa/El País	23–26 Apr 1983	?	70–75	42.7; 25/28	23.2; 10/12	6.2; 2	11.8; 3/4	19.5
1982 general election	28 Oct 1982	—N/a	82.5	50.8	35.6	3.8	–	15.2

== Results ==
=== Overall ===
Summary of the 8 May 1983 Regional Assembly of Murcia election results →
Parties and alliances	Popular vote			Seats	
Parties and alliances	Votes	%	±pp	Total	+/−
Spanish Socialist Workers' Party (PSOE)	238,968	52.23	n/a	26	n/a
People's Coalition (AP–PDP–UL)	162,074	35.42	n/a	16	n/a
Communist Party of Spain (PCE)	32,113	7.02	n/a	1	n/a
Cantonal Party (PCAN)	12,967	2.83	n/a	0	n/a
Democratic and Social Centre (CDS)	5,224	1.14	n/a	0	n/a
Liberal Democratic Party (PDL)	3,603	0.79	n/a	0	n/a
Blank ballots	2,608	0.57	n/a		
Total	457,557			43	n/a
Valid votes	457,557	98.99	n/a		
Invalid votes	4,655	1.01	n/a		
Votes cast / turnout	462,212	68.47	n/a		
Abstentions	212,870	31.53	n/a		
Registered voters	675,082				

Popular vote
PSOE	52.23%
AP–PDP–UL	35.42%
PCE	7.02%
PCAN	2.83%
CDS	1.14%
PDL	0.79%
Blank ballots	0.57%

Seats
PSOE	60.47%
AP–PDP–UL	37.21%
PCE	2.33%

=== Distribution by constituency ===
Constituency	PSOE		CP		PCE	
Constituency	%	S	%	S	%	S
One	60.4	5	30.1	2	6.9	−
Two	49.4	6	31.1	4	5.3	−
Three	50.5	10	39.2	8	7.1	1
Four	57.9	3	32.5	1	6.7	−
Five	46.7	2	38.6	1	14.0	−
Total	52.2	26	35.4	16	7.0	1

== Aftermath ==
=== Government formation ===
Under Article 31 of the Statute, investiture processes to elect the president of the Region of Murcia required of an absolute majority—more than half the votes cast—to be obtained in the first ballot. If unsuccessful, new ballots would be held within 48-hour periods requiring only of a simple majority—more affirmative than negative votes—to succeed. In the event of the investiture process failing to elect a regional president within a two-month period from the first ballot, the Cortes were to be automatically dissolved and a fresh election called, with elected lawmakers serving the remainder of its original four-year term.

Investiture; Andrés Hernández Ros (PSOE)
Ballot →	14 June 1983
Required majority →	22 out of 43
Yes: • PSOE (26)	26 / 43
No: • AP–PDP–UL (16)	16 / 43
Abstentions: • PCE (1)	1 / 43
Absentees	0 / 43

=== 1984 political crisis ===
In February 1984, the regional government came under criticism from the opposition and other various organizations because of a decision to increase the salary of its members by up to 17%, dubbed "an insult to the working class". While the increase would be later amended by the Socialist group in the Regional Assembly, the resignation in 27 February of the regional Economy and Finance minister, José Molina, because of "interference in the management of [his] department" from the regional president Andrés Hernandez Ros, resulted in the President attempting a reshuffle of his whole cabinet amid calls for his resignation from the General Union of Workers (UGT). The issue turned into a major political scandal after the unveiling of an attempted bribery of two journalists from the La Verdad newspaper in exchange for stopping an alleged smear campaign against the regional government.

As a result of the scandal, President Hernandez Ros announced his resignation on 4 March 1984, effective from 9 March. The crisis had aggravated the situation of internal infighting within the regional PSOE over disagreements with Hernández Ros's economic policy, said to invest in "high-risk" enterprises that exceeded the regional government's financial capacities, as well as his perceived confrontational style of governing. The party proposed the incumbent speaker of the Regional Assembly, Carlos Collado, to succeed Hernández Ros in the post of regional president, seeking to enforce a more austere economic approach. The political crisis in Murcia was the third in a row within a month for the government of an autonomous community, following Andalusia and Cantabria, with a crisis in the Basque Country later in the year resulting in a total of four regional presidents having tendered their resignations throughout 1984.

Investiture; Carlos Collado (PSOE)
Ballot →	28 March 1984
Required majority →	22 out of 43
Yes: • PSOE (26)	26 / 43
No: • AP–PDP–UL (14)	14 / 43
Abstentions: • PCE (1)	1 / 43
Absentees: • AP–PDP–UL (2)	2 / 43
