= District Three (Regional Assembly of Murcia constituency) =

- Former Regional Assembly of Murcia; Electoral constituency
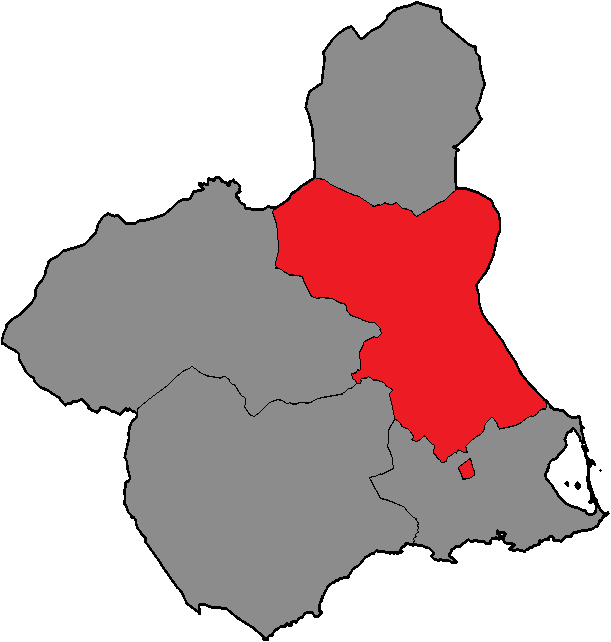
- Location of the District Three within the Region of Murcia
- Province: Murcia
- Autonomous community: Region of Murcia

Former constituency
- Created: 1983
- Abolished: 2015
- Seats: 19 (1983–1987); 20 (1987–1991); 21 (1991–2007); 20 (2007–2011); 21 (2011–2015)

District Three was one of the five constituencies (Spanish: circunscripciones) represented in the Regional Assembly of Murcia, the regional legislature of the Region of Murcia. The constituency last elected 21 deputies in 2015. It comprised the municipalities of Murcia, Alcantarilla, Beniel, Molina de Segura, Alguazas, Las Torres de Cotillas, Lorquí, Ceutí, Cieza, Abarán, Blanca, Archena, Ricote, Ulea, Villanueva del Río Segura, Ojós, Fortuna, Abanilla and Santomera. The electoral system used the D'Hondt method and a closed-list proportional representation, with a minimum threshold of five percent regionally.

== Electoral system ==
The constituency was created as per the Statute of Autonomy for the Region of Murcia of 1982 and was first contested in the 1983 regional election. The Statute provided for sub-provincial divisions of the Principality's territory to be established as multi-member districts in the Regional Assembly of Murcia, with this regulation being maintained under the 1986 regional electoral law. Each constituency was entitled to an initial minimum of one seat, with the remaining 40 being distributed in proportion to their populations. The exception was the 1983 election, when constituencies were allocated one fixed member and one additional member per each 25,000 inhabitants or fraction greater than 12,500.

Voting was on the basis of universal suffrage, which comprised all nationals over eighteen, registered in the Region of Murcia and in full enjoyment of their political rights. Amendments to the electoral law in 2011 required for Murcians abroad to apply for voting before being permitted to vote, a system known as "begged" or expat vote (Spanish: Voto rogado). Seats were elected using the D'Hondt method and a closed list proportional representation, with an electoral threshold of five percent of valid votes—which included blank ballots—being applied regionally. The use of the D'Hondt method might result in a higher effective threshold, depending on the district magnitude.

The electoral law allowed for parties and federations registered in the interior ministry, coalitions and groupings of electors to present lists of candidates. Parties and federations intending to form a coalition ahead of an election were required to inform the relevant Electoral Commission within ten days of the election call—fifteen before 1985—whereas groupings of electors needed to secure the signature of at least two percent of the electorate in the constituencies for which they sought election—one-thousandth of the electorate, with a compulsory minimum of 500 signatures, until 1985—disallowing electors from signing for more than one list of candidates.

A 2015 legal amendment saw the abolition of the five constituencies and their replacement by a single multi-member district comprising all the municipalities in the autonomous community. The electoral threshold was also lowered from five to three percent.

== Deputies ==
Deputies 1983–2015
Key to parties PCE IU Podemos PSOE CDS C's PP CP AP
Assembly	Election	Distribution
1st	1983	1 / 10 / 8
2nd	1987	1 / 9 / 2 / 8
3rd	1991	2 / 10 / 9
4th	1995	2 / 6 / 13
5th	1999	1 / 7 / 13
6th	2003	1 / 7 / 13
7th	2007	1 / 6 / 13
8th	2011	1 / 5 / 15
9th	2015	3 / 5 / 3 / 10

== Regional elections ==
=== 2015 ===
Summary of the 24 May 2015 Regional Assembly of Murcia election results in District Three
Parties and alliances	Popular vote			Seats	
Parties and alliances	Votes	%	±pp	Total	+/−
People's Party (PP)	123,022	37.12	–22.75	10	–5
Spanish Socialist Workers' Party (PSOE)	71,286	21.51	–0.52	5	±0
We Can (Podemos)	48,455	14.62	New	3	+3
Citizens–Party of the Citizenry (C's)	47,831	14.43	New	3	+3
Winning the Region of Murcia: Plural Left (IU–V–RM–CLI–AS)^{1}	14,113	4.26	–3.22	0	–1
Union, Progress and Democracy (UPyD)	6,898	2.08	–3.20	0	±0
Citizens of Democratic Centre (CCD)	4,409	1.33	New	0	±0
Animalist Party Against Mistreatment of Animals (PACMA)	3,497	1.06	New	0	±0
Vox (Vox)	3,356	1.01	New	0	±0
Blank Seats (EB)	993	0.30	New	0	±0
Communist Party of the Peoples of Spain (PCPE)	763	0.23	New	0	±0
Zero Cuts (Recortes Cero)	727	0.22	New	0	±0
Citizens' Democratic Renewal Movement (RED)	602	0.18	New	0	±0
Centre and Democracy Forum (CyD)	405	0.12	–0.04	0	±0
Blank ballots	5,017	1.51	–0.67		
Total	331,374			21	±0
Valid votes	331,374	98.30	–0.03		
Invalid votes	5,747	1.70	+0.03		
Votes cast / turnout	337,121	64.99	–2.70		
Abstentions		35.01	+2.70		
Registered voters					
Sources
Footnotes: ^{1} Winning the Region of Murcia: Plural Left results are compared to United Left–Greens of the Region of Murcia totals in the 2011 election.

=== 2011 ===
Summary of the 22 May 2011 Regional Assembly of Murcia election results in District Three
Parties and alliances	Popular vote			Seats	
Parties and alliances	Votes	%	±pp	Total	+/−
People's Party (PP)	200,593	59.87	–1.78	15	+2
Spanish Socialist Workers' Party (PSOE)	73,808	22.03	–7.75	5	–1
United Left–Greens of the Region of Murcia (IU–V–RM)	25,076	7.48	+1.61	1	±0
Union, Progress and Democracy (UPyD)	17,680	5.28	New	0	±0
Liberal Democratic Centre (CDL)	4,713	1.41	+1.03	0	±0
The Greens of the Region of Murcia–Ecolo (LV–Ecolo)	2,170	0.65	New	0	±0
Party for the Regeneration of Democracy in Spain (PRDE)	696	0.21	New	0	±0
Renewed United Democratic Centre (CDUR)	645	0.19	New	0	±0
Employment Business Party (PEE)	593	0.18	New	0	±0
National Democracy (DN)	541	0.16	±0.00	0	±0
Centre and Democracy Forum (CyD)	522	0.16	New	0	±0
Communist Unification of Spain (UCE)	361	0.11	New	0	±0
State Reform of Nostradamus (REN)	339	0.10	New	0	±0
Blank ballots	7,291	2.18	+0.81		
Total	335,028			21	+1
Valid votes	335,028	98.33	–1.06		
Invalid votes	5,703	1.67	+1.06		
Votes cast / turnout	340,731	67.69	–1.20		
Abstentions		32.31	+1.20		
Registered voters					

=== 2007 ===
Summary of the 27 May 2007 Regional Assembly of Murcia election results in District Three
Parties and alliances	Popular vote			Seats	
Parties and alliances	Votes	%	±pp	Total	+/−
People's Party (PP)	204,522	61.65	+1.85	13	±0
Spanish Socialist Workers' Party (PSOE)	98,794	29.78	–1.89	6	–1
United Left–The Greens of the Region of Murcia (IU–LV–RM)^{1}	19,458	5.87	–0.72	1	±0
Regional Citizens' Coalition (CCR)	2,052	0.62	New	0	±0
Liberal Democratic Centre (CDL)	1,247	0.38	New	0	±0
Spanish Phalanx of the CNSO (FE–JONS)	591	0.18	New	0	±0
National Democracy (DN)	523	0.16	New	0	±0
Blank ballots	4,561	1.37	–0.25		
Total	331,748			20	–1
Valid votes	331,748	99.39	+0.03		
Invalid votes	2,022	0.61	–0.03		
Votes cast / turnout	333,770	68.89	–2.83		
Abstentions		31.11	+2.83		
Registered voters					
Sources
Footnotes: ^{1} United Left–The Greens of the Region of Murcia results are compared to the combined totals of United Left and The Greens in the 2003 election.

=== 2003 ===
Summary of the 25 May 2003 Regional Assembly of Murcia election results in District Three
Parties and alliances	Popular vote			Seats	
Parties and alliances	Votes	%	±pp	Total	+/−
People's Party (PP)	199,485	59.80	+3.50	13	±0
Spanish Socialist Workers' Party (PSOE)	105,651	31.67	–1.58	7	±0
United Left of the Region of Murcia (IURM)	16,030	4.81	–1.62	1	±0
The Greens (LV)	5,935	1.78	+0.78	0	±0
Humanist Party (PH)	1,063	0.32	New	0	±0
Blank ballots	5,399	1.62	+0.10		
Total	333,563			21	±0
Valid votes	333,563	99.36	±0.00		
Invalid votes	2,156	0.64	±0.00		
Votes cast / turnout	335,719	71.72	+2.67		
Abstentions		28.28	–2.67		
Registered voters					

=== 1999 ===
Summary of the 13 June 1999 Regional Assembly of Murcia election results in District Three
Parties and alliances	Popular vote			Seats	
Parties and alliances	Votes	%	±pp	Total	+/−
People's Party (PP)	174,476	56.30	–0.05	13	±0
Spanish Socialist Workers' Party (PSOE)	103,039	33.25	+5.09	7	+1
United Left of the Region of Murcia (IURM)	19,915	6.43	–6.19	1	–1
The Greens (LV)	3,101	1.00	New	0	±0
Spanish Democratic Party (PADE)	2,669	0.86	New	0	±0
Centrist Union–Democratic and Social Centre (UC–CDS)	1,028	0.33	–0.23	0	±0
Union of the Peoples of Murcia (UPM)	962	0.31	New	0	±0
Blank ballots	4,707	1.52	+0.48		
Total	309,897			21	±0
Valid votes	309,897	99.36	+0.03		
Invalid votes	1,982	0.64	–0.03		
Votes cast / turnout	311,879	69.05	–9.26		
Abstentions		30.95	+9.26		
Registered voters					

=== 1995 ===
Summary of the 28 May 1995 Regional Assembly of Murcia election results in District Three
Parties and alliances	Popular vote			Seats	
Parties and alliances	Votes	%	±pp	Total	+/−
People's Party (PP)	182,354	56.35	+18.62	13	+4
Spanish Socialist Workers' Party (PSOE)	91,129	28.16	–14.22	6	–4
United Left–The Greens of the Region of Murcia (IU–LV–RM)^{1}	40,845	12.62	+1.14	2	±0
Centrist Union–Democratic and Social Centre (UC–CDS)	1,815	0.56	–2.86	0	±0
Regional Murcianist Party (PMR)	1,427	0.44	New	0	±0
Spanish Confederation of Independents (CEDI)	1,298	0.40	New	0	±0
New Region (NR)	767	0.24	New	0	±0
Democratic Bloc (BD)	411	0.13	New	0	±0
Cantonal Party (PCAN)	210	0.06	–2.77	0	±0
Blank ballots	3,367	1.04	+0.05		
Total	323,623			21	±0
Valid votes	323,623	99.33	+0.09		
Invalid votes	2,169	0.67	–0.09		
Votes cast / turnout	325,792	78.31	+9.27		
Abstentions		21.69	–9.27		
Registered voters					
Sources
Footnotes: ^{1} United Left–The Greens of the Region of Murcia results are compared to the combined totals of United Left and The Greens in the 1991 election.

=== 1991 ===
Summary of the 26 May 1991 Regional Assembly of Murcia election results in District Three
Parties and alliances	Popular vote			Seats	
Parties and alliances	Votes	%	±pp	Total	+/−
Spanish Socialist Workers' Party (PSOE)	110,260	42.38	+0.45	10	+1
People's Party (PP)^{1}	98,176	37.73	+1.84	9	+1
United Left (IU)	26,708	10.27	+2.75	2	+1
Democratic and Social Centre (CDS)	8,894	3.42	–8.84	0	–2
Regional Electoral Coalition (PCAN–PRM)^{2}	7,375	2.83	+2.10	0	±0
The Greens (LV)	3,161	1.21	New	0	±0
Rainbow (Arcoiris)	1,839	0.71	New	0	±0
The Greens Ecologist–Humanist List (LVLE–H)^{3}	1,196	0.46	+0.16	0	±0
Blank ballots	2,575	0.99	+0.06		
Total	260,184			21	+1
Valid votes	260,184	99.24	+0.32		
Invalid votes	2,000	0.76	–0.32		
Votes cast / turnout	262,184	69.04	–5.28		
Abstentions		30.96	+5.28		
Registered voters					
Sources
Footnotes: ^{1} People's Party results are compared to People's Alliance totals in the 1987 election.; ^{2} Regional Electoral Coalition results are compared to the combined totals of Cantonal Party and Murcian Regionalist Party in the 1987 election.; ^{3} The Greens Ecologist–Humanist List results are compared to Humanist Platform totals in the 1987 election.

=== 1987 ===
Summary of the 10 June 1987 Regional Assembly of Murcia election results in District Three
Parties and alliances	Popular vote			Seats	
Parties and alliances	Votes	%	±pp	Total	+/−
Spanish Socialist Workers' Party (PSOE)	104,747	41.93	–8.58	9	–1
People's Alliance (AP)^{1}	89,670	35.89	–3.27	8	±0
Democratic and Social Centre (CDS)	30,616	12.26	+10.59	2	+2
United Left (IU)^{2}	18,797	7.52	+0.43	1	±0
Murcian Regionalist Party (PRM)	1,329	0.53	New	0	±0
Workers' Party of Spain–Communist Unity (PTE–UC)	1,103	0.44	New	0	±0
Humanist Platform (PH)	738	0.30	New	0	±0
Cantonal Party (PCAN)	491	0.20	–0.03	0	±0
Blank ballots	2,321	0.93	+0.34		
Total	249,812			20	+1
Valid votes	249,812	98.92	–0.09		
Invalid votes	2,731	1.08	+0.09		
Votes cast / turnout	252,543	74.32	+4.62		
Abstentions	87,266	25.68	–4.62		
Registered voters	339,809				
Sources
Footnotes: ^{1} People's Alliance results are compared to People's Coalition totals in the 1983 election.; ^{2} United Left results are compared to Communist Party of Spain totals in the 1983 election.

=== 1983 ===
Summary of the 8 May 1983 Regional Assembly of Murcia election results in District Three
Parties and alliances	Popular vote			Seats	
Parties and alliances	Votes	%	±pp	Total	+/−
Spanish Socialist Workers' Party (PSOE)	112,717	50.51	n/a	10	n/a
People's Coalition (AP–PDP–UL)	87,386	39.16	n/a	8	n/a
Communist Party of Spain (PCE)	15,811	7.09	n/a	1	n/a
Democratic and Social Centre (CDS)	3,724	1.67	n/a	0	n/a
Liberal Democratic Party (PDL)	1,673	0.75	n/a	0	n/a
Cantonal Party (PCAN)	524	0.23	n/a	0	n/a
Blank ballots	1,306	0.59	n/a		
Total	223,141			19	n/a
Valid votes	223,141	99.01	n/a		
Invalid votes	2,232	0.99	n/a		
Votes cast / turnout	225,373	69.70	n/a		
Abstentions	97,957	30.30	n/a		
Registered voters	323,330				
