= 2011 Murcian regional election =

Election in the Spanish region of Murcia

- 22 May 2011

All 45 seats in the Regional Assembly of Murcia 23 seats needed for a majority
- Opinion polls
- Registered: 974,998 ▲1.2%
- Turnout: 662,086 (67.9%) ▼0.1 pp
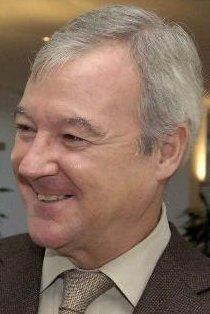

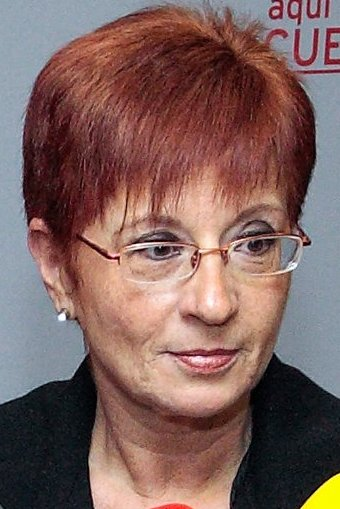

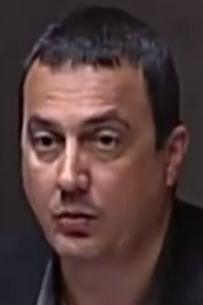
	First party	Second party	Third party
Leader	Ramón Luis Valcárcel	Begoña García Retegui	José Antonio Pujante
Party	PP	PSOE	IU
Leader since	5 October 1991	3 October 2010	April 2005
Leader's seat	Three	Three	Three
Last election	29 seats, 58.3%	15 seats, 32.0%	1 seat, 6.3%
Seats won	33	11	1
Seat change	▲4	▼4	0
Popular vote	382,871	155,506	50,988
Percentage	58.8%	23.9%	7.8%
Swing	▲0.5 pp	▼8.1 pp	▲1.5 pp
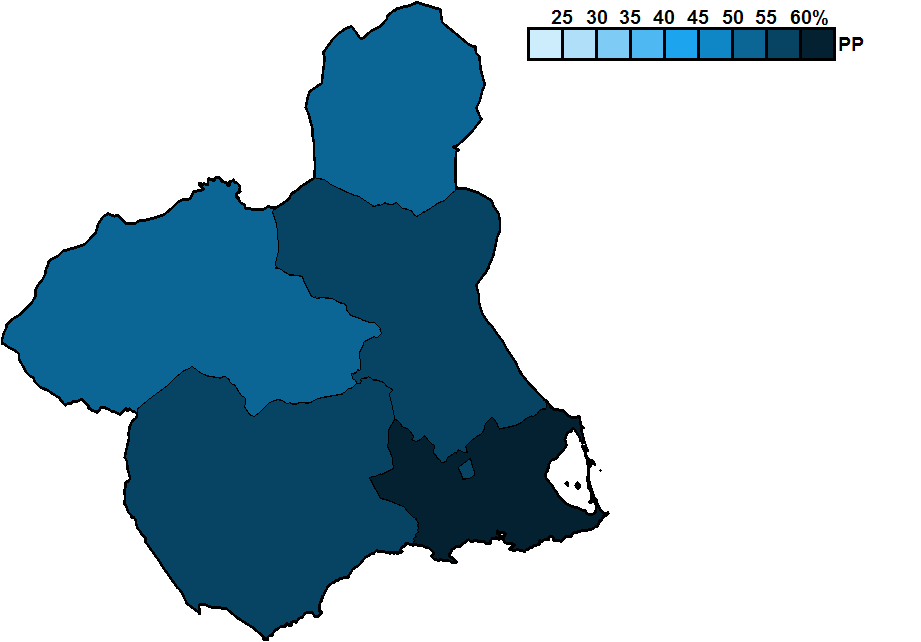
- Constituency results map for the Regional Assembly of Murcia
President before election
Ramón Luis Valcárcel
PP
Elected President
Ramón Luis Valcárcel
PP

A regional election was held in the Region of Murcia on 22 May 2011 to elect the 8th Regional Assembly of the autonomous community. All 45 seats in the Regional Assembly were up for election. It was held concurrently with regional elections in twelve other autonomous communities and local elections all across Spain.

The election was won by the People's Party (PP), which obtained its best result ever in the Region. With over 70% of the seats (33), it obtained thrice the number of seats of the second most voted party, the Spanish Socialist Workers' Party (PSOE), which plummeted to just below 24% and 11 seats. The PP had won its first election in 1995, and under Ramón Luis Valcárcel it had achieved an absolute majority of seats and votes in all elections held ever since.

All in all, the PP gained four seats from the PSOE, with United Left (IU) holding its solitary seat but gaining ground, increasing its % of the share from 6.3% to 7.8%. The 5% regional threshold prevented Union, Progress and Democracy (UPyD) from winning a seat as, although it polled 5.3% in District Three, its vote in the entire Murcian region was 4.5%.

== Overview ==
=== Electoral system ===
The Regional Assembly of Murcia was the devolved, unicameral legislature of the autonomous community of Murcia, having legislative power in regional matters as defined by the Spanish Constitution and the Murcian Statute of Autonomy, as well as the ability to vote confidence in or withdraw it from a regional president.

Voting for the Regional Assembly was on the basis of universal suffrage, which comprised all nationals over 18 years of age, registered in the Region of Murcia and in full enjoyment of their political rights. Amendments to the electoral law in 2011 required for Murcians abroad to apply for voting before being permitted to vote, a system known as "begged" or expat vote (Spanish: Voto rogado). The 45 members of the Regional Assembly of Murcia were elected using the D'Hondt method and a closed list proportional representation, with an electoral threshold of five percent of valid votes—which included blank ballots—being applied regionally. Seats were allocated to constituencies, which were established by law as follows:

- District One (comprising the municipalities of Lorca, Aguilas, Puerto Lumbreras, Totana, Alhama de Murcia, Librilla, Aledo and Mazarrón).
- District Two (comprising the municipalities of Cartagena, La Unión, Fuente Alamo de Murcia, Torre-Pacheco, San Javier, San Pedro del Pinatar and Los Alcázares).
- District Three (comprising the municipalities of Murcia, Alcantarilla, Beniel, Molina de Segura, Alguazas, Las Torres de Cotillas, Lorquí, Ceutí, Cieza, Abarán, Blanca, Archena, Ricote, Ulea, Villanueva del Río Segura, Ojós, Fortuna, Abanilla and Santomera).
- District Four (comprising the municipalities of Caravaca, Cehegín, Calasparra, Moratalla, Bullas, Pliego, Mula, Albudeite and Campos del Río).
- District Five (comprising the municipalities of Yecla and Jumilla).

Each constituency was entitled to an initial minimum of one seat, with the remaining 40 allocated among the constituencies in proportion to their populations.

=== Election date ===
The term of the Regional Assembly of Murcia expired four years after the date of its previous election. Elections to the Regional Assembly were fixed for the fourth Sunday of May every four years. The previous election was held on 27 May 2007, setting the election date for the Regional Assembly on 22 May 2011.

The president had the prerogative to dissolve the Regional Assembly of Murcia and call a snap election, provided that no motion of no confidence was in process, no nationwide election was due and some time requirements were met: namely, that dissolution did not occur either during the first legislative session or within the legislature's last year ahead of its scheduled expiry, nor before one year had elapsed since a previous dissolution under this procedure. In the event of an investiture process failing to elect a regional president within a two-month period from the first ballot, the Regional Assembly was to be automatically dissolved and a fresh election called. Any snap election held as a result of these circumstances would not alter the period to the next ordinary election, with elected lawmakers serving the remainder of its original four-year term.

== Parties and candidates ==
The electoral law allowed for parties and federations registered in the interior ministry, coalitions and groupings of electors to present lists of candidates. Parties and federations intending to form a coalition ahead of an election were required to inform the relevant Electoral Commission within ten days of the election call, whereas groupings of electors needed to secure the signature of at least one percent of the electorate in the Region of Murcia, disallowing electors from signing for more than one list of candidates.

Below is a list of the main parties and electoral alliances which contested the election:

Candidacy	Parties and alliances	Leading candidate	Ideology	Previous result		Gov.	Ref.
Candidacy	Parties and alliances	Leading candidate	Ideology	Vote %	Seats	Gov.	Ref.
PP	List: People's Party (PP)	Ramón Luis Valcárcel	Conservatism; Christian democracy	58.3%	29	Yes	
PSOE	List: Spanish Socialist Workers' Party (PSOE)	Begoña García Retegui	Social democracy	32.0%	15	No	
IU–V–RM	List: United Left–Greens of the Region of Murcia (IU–V–RM); Eco-socialists of the Region of Murcia (Eco)	José Antonio Pujante	Socialism; Communism; Eco-socialism	6.3%	1	No	

== Opinion polls ==
The table below lists voting intention estimates in reverse chronological order, showing the most recent first and using the dates when the survey fieldwork was done, as opposed to the date of publication. Where the fieldwork dates are unknown, the date of publication is given instead. The highest percentage figure in each polling survey is displayed with its background shaded in the leading party's colour. If a tie ensues, this is applied to the figures with the highest percentages. The "Lead" column on the right shows the percentage-point difference between the parties with the highest percentages in a poll. When available, seat projections determined by the polling organisations are displayed below (or in place of) the percentages in a smaller font; 23 seats were required for an absolute majority in the Regional Assembly of Murcia.

Polling firm/Commissioner	Fieldwork date	Sample size	Turnout	PP	PSOE	IU	UPyD	Lead
2011 regional election	22 May 2011	—N/a	67.9	58.8; 33	23.9; 11	7.8; 1	4.5; 0	34.9
CEMOP	5–10 May 2011	1,201	?	59.8; 30	25.9; 14	8.5; 1	3.6; 0	33.9
NC Report/La Razón	3–10 May 2011	?	?	59.9; 30/31	27.8; 13/14	? 1	–	32.1
TNS Demoscopia/Antena 3	7 May 2011	?	?	59.1; 30/31	26.2; 12/13	8.3; 2	–	32.9
NC Report/La Razón	25 Apr 2011	?	?	59.6; 30/31	28.0; 13/14	8.5; 1	2.3; 0	31.6
Celeste-Tel/Terra	13–20 Apr 2011	400	?	59.6; 32	26.0; 12	8.5; 1	4.3; 0	33.6
CIS	17 Mar–17 Apr 2011	1,491	?	61.8; 31	26.0; 13	6.6; 1	2.3; 0	35.8
Sigma Dos/El Mundo	11–14 Apr 2011	500	?	61.7; 31/32	24.8; 11/13	7.1; 1/2	–	36.9
Ikerfel/Vocento	4–14 Apr 2011	2,300	?	59.6; 31	26.9; 13	6.6; 1	–	32.7
IMAES/CEMOP	25 Mar–1 Apr 2011	900	?	59.2	25.5	8.8	4.8	33.7
Sigma Dos/El Mundo	27–29 Dec 2010	500	?	61.8; 31/32	25.4; 12/13	7.3; 1	–	36.4
IMAES/CEMOP	21–26 Oct 2010	600	?	63.4	21.9	8.8	4.1	41.5
Sigma Dos/El Mundo	2–4 May 2010	700	?	62.7; 31/33	26.8; 12/14	4.6; 0	–	35.9
TNS Demoscopia/CEMOP	22–28 Apr 2010	603	?	61.7	24.5	7.7	4.2	37.2
Consultores CSA/La Verdad	29 Nov 2009	1,111	?	60.0	31.3	5.2	–	28.7
Synovate/CEMOP	26 Oct–6 Nov 2009	1,094	68.3	61.5	28.5	4.9	3.2	33.0
2009 EP election	7 Jun 2009	—N/a	48.0	61.5	29.8	3.0	2.9	31.7
Synovate/CEMOP	21–26 Apr 2009	608	58.3	61.1	29.0	4.4	3.4	32.1
2008 general election	9 Mar 2008	—N/a	79.6	61.2	32.9	2.9	0.9	28.3
2007 regional election	27 May 2007	—N/a	68.0	58.3; 29	32.0; 15	6.3; 1	–	26.3

== Results ==
=== Overall ===
← Summary of the 22 May 2011 Regional Assembly of Murcia election results →
Parties and alliances	Popular vote			Seats	
Parties and alliances	Votes	%	±pp	Total	+/−
People's Party (PP)	382,871	58.79	+0.49	33	+4
Spanish Socialist Workers' Party (PSOE)	155,506	23.88	−8.12	11	−4
United Left–Greens of the Region of Murcia (IU–V–RM)	50,988	7.83	+1.58	1	±0
Union, Progress and Democracy (UPyD)	29,279	4.50	New	0	±0
The Greens of the Region of Murcia–Ecolo (LV–Ecolo)	7,659	1.18	New	0	±0
Liberal Democratic Centre (CDL)	3,930	0.60	+0.02	0	±0
Party for the Regeneration of Democracy in Spain (PRDE)	1,177	0.18	New	0	±0
Employment Business Party (PEE)	1,057	0.16	New	0	±0
National Democracy (DN)	856	0.13	−0.02	0	±0
Renewed United Democratic Centre (CDUR)	834	0.13	New	0	±0
Centre and Democracy Forum (CyD)	824	0.13	New	0	±0
Communist Unification of Spain (UCE)	719	0.11	New	0	±0
State Reform of Nostradamus (REN)	621	0.10	New	0	±0
The Phalanx (FE)	488	0.07	New	0	±0
Republican Platform–Republican Coalition of the Region of Murcia (PRCR)	220	0.03	New	0	±0
Citizens' Convergence of the South-East (CCSE)	182	0.03	New	0	±0
Blank ballots	14,050	2.16	+0.83		
Total	651,261			45	±0
Valid votes	651,261	98.37	−0.87		
Invalid votes	10,825	1.63	+0.87		
Votes cast / turnout	662,086	67.91	−0.10		
Abstentions	312,912	32.09	+0.10		
Registered voters	974,998				

Popular vote
PP	58.79%
PSOE	23.88%
IU–V–RM	7.83%
UPyD	4.50%
LV–Ecolo	1.18%
Others	1.67%
Blank ballots	2.16%

Seats
PP	73.33%
PSOE	24.44%
IU–V–RM	2.22%

=== Distribution by constituency ===
Constituency	PP		PSOE		IU–V–RM	
Constituency	%	S	%	S	%	S
One	57.2	5	26.7	2	9.6	−
Two	60.8	8	21.4	2	6.9	−
Three	59.9	15	22.0	5	7.5	1
Four	53.2	3	33.9	1	7.9	−
Five	52.3	2	29.0	1	10.2	−
Total	58.8	33	23.9	11	7.8	1

== Aftermath ==
=== Government formation ===
Investiture; Ramón Luis Valcárcel (PP)
Ballot →	22 June 2011
Required majority →	23 out of 45
Yes: • PP (33)	33 / 45
No: • PSOE (11); • IU–V–RM (1)	12 / 45
Abstentions	0 / 45
Absentees	0 / 45

=== 2014 investiture ===
Investiture; Alberto Garre (PP)
Ballot →	8 April 2014
Required majority →	23 out of 45
Yes: • PP (33)	33 / 45
No: • PSOE (10); • IU–V–RM (1)	11 / 45
Abstentions	0 / 45
Absentees: • PSOE (1)	1 / 45
