= 1991 Murcian regional election =

Election in the Spanish region of Murcia

- 26 May 1991

All 45 seats in the Regional Assembly of Murcia 23 seats needed for a majority
- Opinion polls
- Registered: 778,256 ▲10.9%
- Turnout: 522,820 (67.2%) ▼5.8 pp
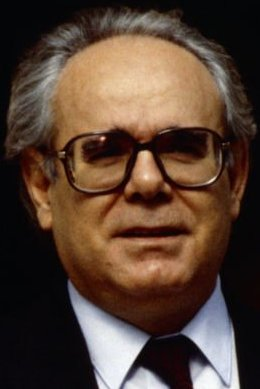

	First party	Second party	Third party
Leader	Carlos Collado	Juan Ramón Calero	Pedro Antonio Ríos
Party	PSOE	PP	IU
Leader since	31 March 1984	4 January 1990	1983
Leader's seat	Three	Three	Three
Last election	25 seats, 43.7%	16 seats, 31.5% (Note: Results for AP in the 1987 election.)	1 seat, 7.5%
Seats won	24	17	4
Seat change	▼1	▲1	▲3
Popular vote	234,421	173,491	52,863
Percentage	45.3%	33.5%	10.2%
Swing	▲1.6 pp	▲2.0 pp	▲2.7 pp
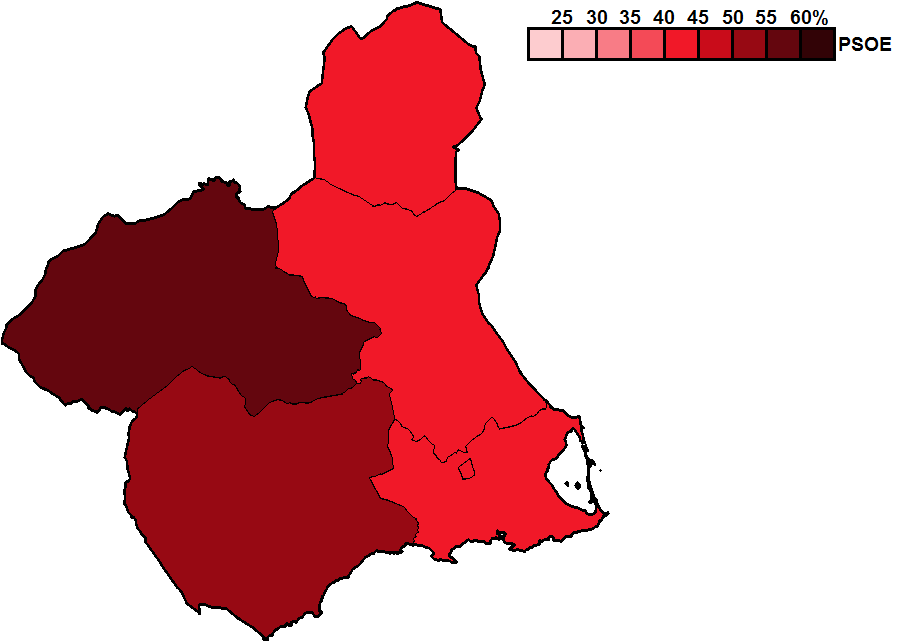
- Constituency results map for the Regional Assembly of Murcia
President before election
Carlos Collado
PSOE
Elected President
Carlos Collado
PSOE

A regional election was held in the Region of Murcia on 26 May 1991 to elect the 3rd Regional Assembly of the autonomous community. All 45 seats in the Regional Assembly were up for election. It was held concurrently with regional elections in twelve other autonomous communities and local elections all across Spain.

The Spanish Socialist Workers' Party (PSOE) under president Carlos Collado won an absolute majority of seats for a third consecutive term in office, as the overall political landscape of the Region remained relatively unchanged. The Democratic and Social Centre (CDS) lost all three of its seats, which were re-distributed among the newly founded People's Party (PP) and the left-wing United Left (IU). The results allowed Collado to be elected as the head of a majority government until April 1993, when he was brought down by his own party and replaced by María Antonia Martínez.

This would be the last regional election victory for the PSOE until 2019, as well as the last time to date that the party accessed the regional government.

== Overview ==
=== Electoral system ===
The Regional Assembly of Murcia was the devolved, unicameral legislature of the autonomous community of Murcia, having legislative power in regional matters as defined by the Spanish Constitution and the Murcian Statute of Autonomy, as well as the ability to vote confidence in or withdraw it from a regional president.

Voting for the Regional Assembly was on the basis of universal suffrage, which comprised all nationals over 18 years of age, registered in the Region of Murcia and in full enjoyment of their political rights. The 45 members of the Regional Assembly of Murcia were elected using the D'Hondt method and a closed list proportional representation, with an electoral threshold of five percent of valid votes—which included blank ballots—being applied regionally. Seats were allocated to constituencies, which were established by law as follows:

- District One (comprising the municipalities of Lorca, Aguilas, Puerto Lumbreras, Totana, Alhama de Murcia, Librilla, Aledo and Mazarrón).
- District Two (comprising the municipalities of Cartagena, La Unión, Fuente Alamo de Murcia, Torre-Pacheco, San Javier, San Pedro del Pinatar and Los Alcázares).
- District Three (comprising the municipalities of Murcia, Alcantarilla, Beniel, Molina de Segura, Alguazas, Las Torres de Cotillas, Lorquí, Ceutí, Cieza, Abarán, Blanca, Archena, Ricote, Ulea, Villanueva del Río Segura, Ojós, Fortuna, Abanilla and Santomera).
- District Four (comprising the municipalities of Caravaca, Cehegín, Calasparra, Moratalla, Bullas, Pliego, Mula, Albudeite and Campos del Río).
- District Five (comprising the municipalities of Yecla and Jumilla).

Each constituency was entitled to an initial minimum of one seat, with the remaining 40 allocated among the constituencies in proportion to their populations.

=== Election date ===
The term of the Regional Assembly of Murcia expired four years after the date of its previous election. Legal amendments earlier in 1991 established that elections to the Regional Assembly were to be fixed for the fourth Sunday of May every four years. The previous election was held on 10 June 1987, setting the election date for the Regional Assembly on 26 May 1991.

The Regional Assembly of Murcia could not be dissolved before the expiration date of parliament except in the event of an investiture process failing to elect a regional president within a two-month period from the first ballot. In such a case, the Regional Assembly was to be automatically dissolved and a snap election called, with elected lawmakers serving the remainder of its original four-year term.

== Parties and candidates ==
The electoral law allowed for parties and federations registered in the interior ministry, coalitions and groupings of electors to present lists of candidates. Parties and federations intending to form a coalition ahead of an election were required to inform the relevant Electoral Commission within ten days of the election call, whereas groupings of electors needed to secure the signature of at least one percent of the electorate in the Region of Murcia, disallowing electors from signing for more than one list of candidates.

Below is a list of the main parties and electoral alliances which contested the election:

Candidacy	Parties and alliances	Leading candidate	Ideology	Previous result		Gov.	Ref.
Candidacy	Parties and alliances	Leading candidate	Ideology	Vote %	Seats	Gov.	Ref.
PSOE	List: Spanish Socialist Workers' Party (PSOE)	Carlos Collado	Social democracy	43.7%	25	Yes	
PP	List: People's Party (PP)	Juan Ramón Calero	Conservatism; Christian democracy	31.5%	16	No	
CDS	List: Democratic and Social Centre (CDS)	Ángel Morenilla	Centrism; Liberalism	11.9%	3	No	
IU	List: United Left (IU)	Pedro Antonio Ríos	Socialism; Communism	7.5%	1	No	

== Opinion polls ==
The table below lists voting intention estimates in reverse chronological order, showing the most recent first and using the dates when the survey fieldwork was done, as opposed to the date of publication. Where the fieldwork dates are unknown, the date of publication is given instead. The highest percentage figure in each polling survey is displayed with its background shaded in the leading party's colour. If a tie ensues, this is applied to the figures with the highest percentages. The "Lead" column on the right shows the percentage-point difference between the parties with the highest percentages in a poll. When available, seat projections determined by the polling organisations are displayed below (or in place of) the percentages in a smaller font; 23 seats were required for an absolute majority in the Regional Assembly of Murcia.

Polling firm/Commissioner	Fieldwork date	Sample size	Turnout	PSOE	AP	CDS	IU	PP	Lead
1991 regional election	26 May 1991	—N/a	67.2	45.3; 24	(Note: Within PP.)	5.0; 0	10.2; 4	33.5; 17	11.8
Sigma Dos/El Mundo	18 May 1991	?	?	46.8; 25/26		3.8; 0	12.9; 3	31.4; 16/17	15.4
Metra Seis/El Independiente	12 May 1991	?	?	41.9; 22/24		8.7; 3	9.3; 3/4	32.5; 15/16	9.4
Demoscopia/El País	4–7 May 1991	600	?	44.9; 23/24		3.0; 0	11.6; 3/4	33.7; 18	11.2
1989 general election	29 Oct 1989	—N/a	74.2	46.1		10.4	9.2	30.0	16.1
1989 EP election	15 Jun 1989	—N/a	58.7	48.2		9.3	6.0	26.7	21.5
1987 regional election	10 Jun 1987	—N/a	73.0	43.7; 25	31.5; 16	11.9; 3	7.5; 1	–	12.2

== Results ==
=== Overall ===
← Summary of the 26 May 1991 Regional Assembly of Murcia election results →
Parties and alliances	Popular vote			Seats	
Parties and alliances	Votes	%	±pp	Total	+/−
Spanish Socialist Workers' Party (PSOE)	234,421	45.27	+1.56	24	−1
People's Party (PP)^{1}	173,491	33.51	+2.00	17	+1
United Left (IU)	52,863	10.21	+2.76	4	+3
Democratic and Social Centre (CDS)	25,938	5.01	−6.92	0	−3
Regional Electoral Coalition (PCAN–PRM)^{2}	15,702	3.03	−0.76	0	±0
The Greens (LV)	5,760	1.11	New	0	±0
Rainbow (Arcoiris)	2,941	0.57	New	0	±0
The Greens Ecologist–Humanist List (LVLE–H)^{3}	1,812	0.35	+0.07	0	±0
Blank ballots	4,853	0.94	−0.02		
Total	517,781			45	±0
Valid votes	517,781	99.04	+0.20		
Invalid votes	5,039	0.96	−0.20		
Votes cast / turnout	522,820	67.18	−5.81		
Abstentions	255,436	32.82	+5.81		
Registered voters	778,256				
Sources
Footnotes: ^{1} People's Party results are compared to People's Alliance totals in the 1987 election.; ^{2} Regional Electoral Coalition results are compared to the combined totals of Cantonal Party and Murcian Regionalist Party in the 1987 election.; ^{3} The Greens Ecologist–Humanist List results are compared to Humanist Platform totals in the 1987 election.

Popular vote
PSOE	45.27%
PP	33.51%
IU	10.21%
CDS	5.01%
PCAN–PRM	3.03%
LV	1.11%
Others	0.92%
Blank ballots	0.94%

Seats
PSOE	53.33%
PP	37.78%
IU	8.89%

=== Distribution by constituency ===
Constituency	PSOE		PP		IU	
Constituency	%	S	%	S	%	S
One	53.1	4	26.9	2	11.4	1
Two	42.7	5	31.7	4	9.5	1
Three	42.4	10	37.7	9	10.3	2
Four	55.3	3	24.9	1	7.4	−
Five	42.0	2	34.8	1	14.4	−
Total	45.3	24	33.5	17	10.2	4

== Aftermath ==
=== Government formation ===
Investiture; Carlos Collado (PSOE)
Ballot →	21 June 1991
Required majority →	23 out of 45
Yes: • PSOE (24)	24 / 45
No: • PP (17)	17 / 45
Abstentions: • IU (3)	3 / 45
Absentees: • IU (1)	1 / 45

=== 1993 crisis ===
The position of the regional president Carlos Collado weakened after the publication of a report from the Court of Auditors recording anomalies in the accounting of the autonomous community throughout 1989; specially the purchase, for an exorbitant price—2 billion Pta compared to its market value of 500 million Pta, a surplus of 1.5 billion—of the Casa Grande estate (Spanish for "Big House") that the community subsequently gave, free of charge, to the General Electric multinational to help its establishment in the Region. The opposition parties PP and IU accused Collado of corruption crimes including embezzlement of public funds, prevarication and bribery, and in February 1993 most of the Socialist Group in the Regional Assembly (22 out of 24 deputies) sent a document to the party's regional executive signalling their loss of confidence in Collado, blaming him for the deterioration of regional governance. The PSOE-controlled Economic Commission of the Regional Assembly sent all documentation on the purchase of the Casa Grande estate to the High Court of Justice of Murcia after appreciating signs of embezzlement and prevarication in Collado's actions.

The PP filled a motion of no confidence on Collado because of "the lack of political and social trust of Collado's government, the ungovernability of the Region and the paralysis of the Administration". The motion was rejected by the absolute majority of the Regional Assembly, which the PSOE commanded. While Collado denied any wrongdoing and rejected a resignation, his party refused to explicitly support his management.

Investiture; Juan Ramón Calero (PP)
Ballot →	10 March 1993
Required majority →	23 out of 45
Yes: • PP (17)	17 / 45
No: • PSOE (24)	24 / 45
Abstentions: • IU (4)	4 / 45
Absentees	0 / 45

The political crisis in the Region escalated by mid-April 1993 after several PSOE members publicly demanded Collado's resignation, with the regional executive considering filling a motion of no confidence on their own president if he kept refusing to stand down. Carlos Collado announced his resignation on 15 April, formalized on 19 April, in order to end the ongoing crisis, being replaced in the post by María Antonia Martínez, who subsequently became the first woman in presiding over a Spanish autonomous community. In 1997, Collado would be acquitted of all charges against him in the Casa Grande scandal that forced his resignation.

Investiture; María Antonia Martínez (PSOE)
Ballot →	27 April 1993
Required majority →	23 out of 45
Yes: • PSOE (24)	24 / 45
No: • PP (16)	16 / 45
Abstentions: • IU (4)	4 / 45
Absentees: • PP (1)	1 / 45

The motives behind the political crisis in the Region were later attributed to the ongoing clash between the two main factions in the PSOE: the guerristas—supporters of Alfonso Guerra, advocating for a strong party organization, and an ideology with more rhetorical, historical and trade union appeals—and the renovadores—centered around Felipe González, aiming for a more pragmatic, social democratic ideology and a more flexible organizational vision. The then regional executive of the PSOE, controlled by the guerristas since 1990, was said to have lost confidence in Collado and to have sought his downfall by putting him in the spotlight of judicial and parliamentary investigations, then having him replaced by the guerrista María Antonia Martínez.
