= 1995 Murcian regional election =

Election in the Spanish region of Murcia

- 28 May 1995

All 45 seats in the Regional Assembly of Murcia 23 seats needed for a majority
- Opinion polls
- Registered: 847,967 ▲9.0%
- Turnout: 638,297 (75.3%) ▲8.1 pp
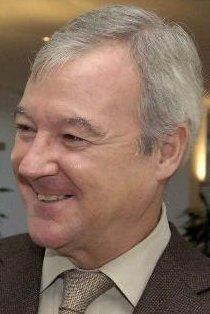

	First party	Second party	Third party
Leader	Ramón Luis Valcárcel	María Antonia Martínez	Antonio Joaquín Dólera
Party	PP	PSOE	IU–LV–RM
Leader since	5 October 1991	28 April 1993	1995
Leader's seat	Three	Three	Three
Last election	17 seats, 33.5%	24 seats, 45.3%	4 seats, 11.3% (Note: Results for IU (10.2%, 4 seats) and LV (1.1%, 0 seats) in the 1991 election.)
Seats won	26	15	4
Seat change	▲9	▼9	0
Popular vote	330,514	201,659	78,875
Percentage	52.2%	31.9%	12.5%
Swing	▲18.7 pp	▼13.4 pp	▲1.2 pp
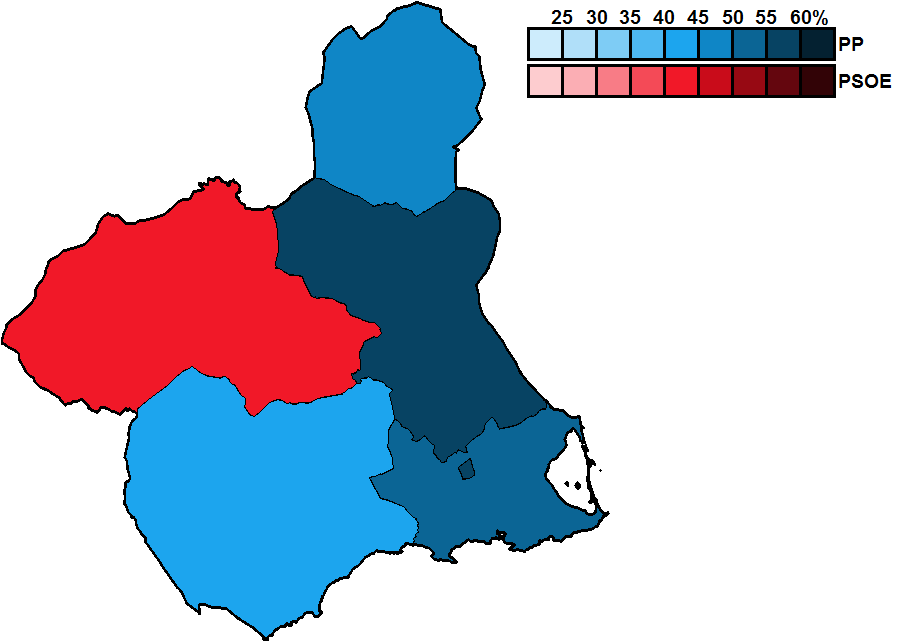
- Constituency results map for the Regional Assembly of Murcia
President before election
María Antonia Martínez
PSOE
Elected President
Ramón Luis Valcárcel
PP

A regional election was held in the Region of Murcia on 28 May 1995 to elect the 4th Regional Assembly of the autonomous community. All 45 seats in the Regional Assembly were up for election. It was held concurrently with regional elections in twelve other autonomous communities and local elections all across Spain.

Former president Carlos Collado had been forced to resign in April 1993 by his own party, the Spanish Socialist Workers' Party (PSOE), as a result of the ongoing struggle between the two main party factions (the guerristas and the renovadores) and a political scandal over the purchase of the Casa Grande estate. He was replaced by María Antonia Martínez, the first woman presiding over a Spanish autonomous community as well as the only one to date holding the office in the Region of Murcia. The crisis resulting in Collado's resignation was among the factors said to contribute to the opposition People's Party (PP) spectacular gains in that year's June general election, overcoming the PSOE as the most voted party in the region for the first time in democracy; a feat which was confirmed in the 1994 European Parliament election.

The regional election resulted in the PP consolidating its gains, winning by a landslide as the vote for the ruling PSOE plummeted. PP leader Ramón Luis Valcárcel would become the new President of the Region of Murcia, with the PP remaining in government ever since. The PP would also remain the prime party of Murcian politics until 2019.

== Overview ==
=== Electoral system ===
The Regional Assembly of Murcia was the devolved, unicameral legislature of the autonomous community of Murcia, having legislative power in regional matters as defined by the Spanish Constitution and the Murcian Statute of Autonomy, as well as the ability to vote confidence in or withdraw it from a regional president.

Voting for the Regional Assembly was on the basis of universal suffrage, which comprised all nationals over 18 years of age, registered in the Region of Murcia and in full enjoyment of their political rights. The 45 members of the Regional Assembly of Murcia were elected using the D'Hondt method and a closed list proportional representation, with an electoral threshold of five percent of valid votes—which included blank ballots—being applied regionally. Seats were allocated to constituencies, which were established by law as follows:

- District One (comprising the municipalities of Lorca, Aguilas, Puerto Lumbreras, Totana, Alhama de Murcia, Librilla, Aledo and Mazarrón).
- District Two (comprising the municipalities of Cartagena, La Unión, Fuente Alamo de Murcia, Torre-Pacheco, San Javier, San Pedro del Pinatar and Los Alcázares).
- District Three (comprising the municipalities of Murcia, Alcantarilla, Beniel, Molina de Segura, Alguazas, Las Torres de Cotillas, Lorquí, Ceutí, Cieza, Abarán, Blanca, Archena, Ricote, Ulea, Villanueva del Río Segura, Ojós, Fortuna, Abanilla and Santomera).
- District Four (comprising the municipalities of Caravaca, Cehegín, Calasparra, Moratalla, Bullas, Pliego, Mula, Albudeite and Campos del Río).
- District Five (comprising the municipalities of Yecla and Jumilla).

Each constituency was entitled to an initial minimum of one seat, with the remaining 40 allocated among the constituencies in proportion to their populations.

=== Election date ===
The term of the Regional Assembly of Murcia expired four years after the date of its previous election. Elections to the Regional Assembly were fixed for the fourth Sunday of May every four years. The previous election was held on 26 May 1991, setting the election date for the Regional Assembly on 28 May 1995.

The Regional Assembly of Murcia could not be dissolved before the expiration date of parliament except in the event of an investiture process failing to elect a regional president within a two-month period from the first ballot. In such a case, the Regional Assembly was to be automatically dissolved and a snap election called, with elected lawmakers serving the remainder of its original four-year term.

== Parties and candidates ==
The electoral law allowed for parties and federations registered in the interior ministry, coalitions and groupings of electors to present lists of candidates. Parties and federations intending to form a coalition ahead of an election were required to inform the relevant Electoral Commission within ten days of the election call, whereas groupings of electors needed to secure the signature of at least one percent of the electorate in the Region of Murcia, disallowing electors from signing for more than one list of candidates.

Below is a list of the main parties and electoral alliances which contested the election:

Candidacy	Parties and alliances	Leading candidate	Ideology	Previous result		Gov.	Ref.
Candidacy	Parties and alliances	Leading candidate	Ideology	Vote %	Seats	Gov.	Ref.
PSOE	List: Spanish Socialist Workers' Party (PSOE)	María Antonia Martínez	Social democracy	45.3%	24	Yes	
PP	List: People's Party (PP)	Ramón Luis Valcárcel	Conservatism; Christian democracy	33.5%	17	No	
IU–LV–RM	List: United Left (IU); The Greens of the Region of Murcia (LVRM)	Antonio Joaquín Dólera	Socialism; Communism	11.3%	4	No	

== Opinion polls ==
The table below lists voting intention estimates in reverse chronological order, showing the most recent first and using the dates when the survey fieldwork was done, as opposed to the date of publication. Where the fieldwork dates are unknown, the date of publication is given instead. The highest percentage figure in each polling survey is displayed with its background shaded in the leading party's colour. If a tie ensues, this is applied to the figures with the highest percentages. The "Lead" column on the right shows the percentage-point difference between the parties with the highest percentages in a poll. When available, seat projections determined by the polling organisations are displayed below (or in place of) the percentages in a smaller font; 23 seats were required for an absolute majority in the Regional Assembly of Murcia.

Color key:

Exit poll

Polling firm/Commissioner	Fieldwork date	Sample size	Turnout	PSOE	PP	IU	Lead
1995 regional election	28 May 1995	—N/a	76.0	31.7; 15	52.3; 26	12.5; 4	20.6
Eco Consulting/RTVE	28 May 1995	?	?	29.9; 14/16	50.9; 23/26	14.8; 5/6	21.0
Demoscopia/El País	10–15 May 1995	800	?	28.2; 13	54.3; 28	12.9; 4	26.1
CIS	24 Apr–10 May 1995	500	72.4	28.6	57.4	11.1	28.8
1994 EP election	12 Jun 1994	—N/a	66.5	31.0	52.2	13.1	21.2
1993 general election	6 Jun 1993	—N/a	81.6	38.6	47.3	9.7	8.7
1991 regional election	26 May 1991	—N/a	67.2	45.3; 24	33.5; 17	10.2; 4	11.8

== Results ==
=== Overall ===
← Summary of the 28 May 1995 Regional Assembly of Murcia election results →
Parties and alliances	Popular vote			Seats	
Parties and alliances	Votes	%	±pp	Total	+/−
People's Party (PP)	330,514	52.23	+18.72	26	+9
Spanish Socialist Workers' Party (PSOE)	201,659	31.87	−13.40	15	−9
United Left–The Greens of the Region of Murcia (IU–LV–RM)^{1}	78,875	12.46	+1.14	4	±0
Centrist Union–Democratic and Social Centre (UC–CDS)	4,359	0.69	−4.32	0	±0
Cantonal Party (PCAN)	3,544	0.56	−2.47	0	±0
Regional Murcianist Party (PMR)	2,456	0.39	New	0	±0
Democratic Bloc (BD)	1,601	0.25	New	0	±0
Spanish Confederation of Independents (CEDI)	1,454	0.23	New	0	±0
New Region (NR)	1,336	0.21	New	0	±0
Blank ballots	7,033	1.11	+0.17		
Total	632,831			45	±0
Valid votes	632,831	99.14	+0.10		
Invalid votes	5,466	0.86	−0.10		
Votes cast / turnout	638,297	75.27	+8.09		
Abstentions	209,670	24.73	−8.09		
Registered voters	847,967				
Sources
Footnotes: ^{1} United Left–The Greens of the Region of Murcia results are compared to the combined totals of United Left and The Greens in the 1991 election.

Popular vote
PP	52.23%
PSOE	31.87%
IU–LV–RM	12.46%
Others	2.33%
Blank ballots	1.11%

Seats
PP	57.78%
PSOE	33.33%
IU–LV–RM	8.89%

=== Distribution by constituency ===
Constituency	PP		PSOE		IU–LV	
Constituency	%	S	%	S	%	S
One	44.9	3	39.3	3	12.8	1
Two	51.9	6	30.7	3	11.5	1
Three	56.3	13	28.2	6	12.6	2
Four	43.2	2	44.4	2	10.5	−
Five	48.0	2	32.1	1	18.0	−
Total	52.2	26	31.9	15	12.5	4

== Aftermath ==
Investiture; Ramón Luis Valcárcel (PP)
Ballot →	30 June 1995
Required majority →	23 out of 45
Yes: • PP (26)	26 / 45
No: • PSOE (15); • IU–LV (4)	19 / 45
Abstentions	0 / 45
Absentees	0 / 45
