= Lycée André Malraux =

Lycée André Malraux may refer to:

Schools in France:

- LGT André Malraux - Allonnes - Allonnes
- Lycée professionnel André Malraux - Béthune
- Lycée André Malraux - Biarritz
- Lycée André Malraux - Gaillon
- Lycée André Malraux - Montataire
- Lycée André Malraux - Montereau-Fault-Yonne

Schools outside of France:

- Lycée Français André Malraux de Murcie in Murcia, Spain
- Lycée André Malraux in Rabat, Morocco
- Lycée Franco-Centrafricain André-Malraux in Bangui, Central African Republic, which merged into the Lycée Français Charles de Gaulle in 1992
