= Regional Assembly of Murcia =

Autonomous parliament of Murcia, Spain

Coordinates: 37°36′26″N 0°58′47″W

Assembly of Murcia Asamblea de Murcia Parlamento de Murcia
- 10th Assembly of Murcia

Type
- Type: Spanish regional legislature
- Houses: Unicameral

Leadership
- President: Visitación Martínez, PP since 14 June 2023
- Vice President: Miguel Ángel Miralles, PP since 11 June 2019
- Second Vice President: Alfonso Martinez, PSOE since 14 June 2023
- Secretary: Francisco José Carrera, Vox since 11 June 2019
- Second Secretary: Emilio Ivars, PSOE since 11 June 2019

Structure
- Seats: 45
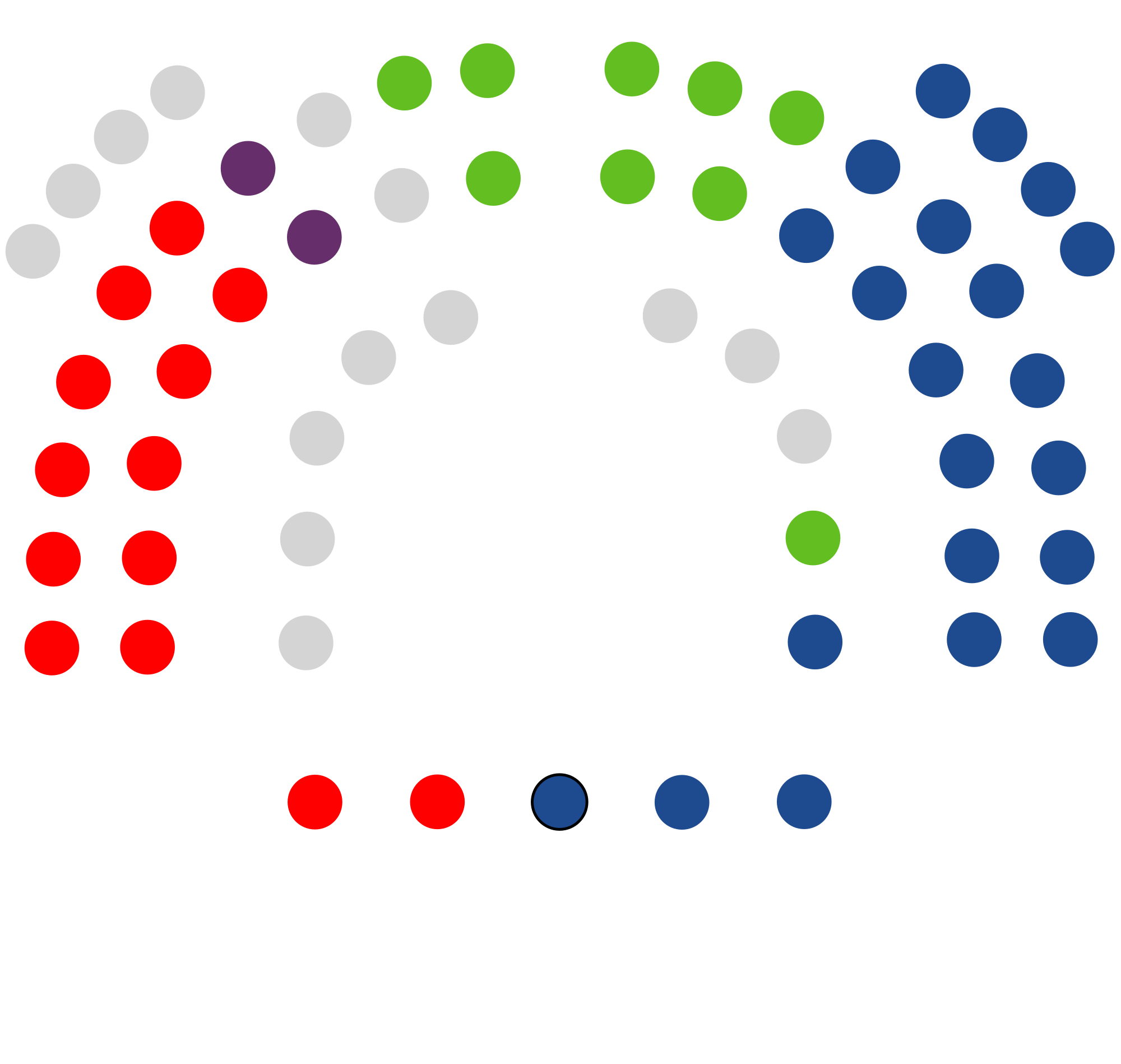
- Political groups: Government (21): PP (21); Opposition (24): PSOE (13); Vox (7); Independent (2) (Note: José Ángel Antelo was expelled from Vox in 2026. After this decision, Virginia Martínez also left Vox.); Podemos (1); IU (1)
- Length of term: 4 years

Elections
- Last election: 28 May 2023

Meeting place
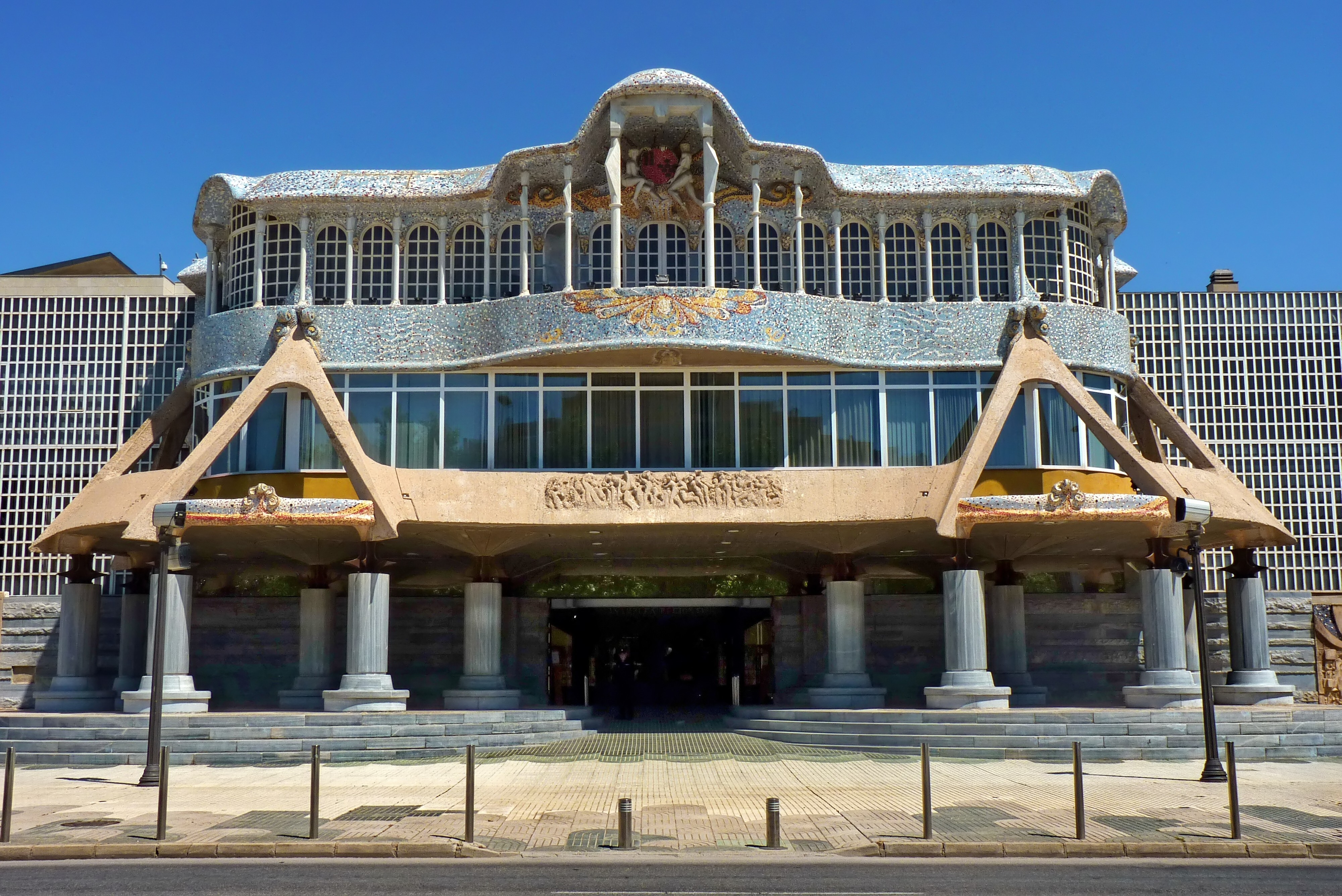
- Regional Assembly building Cartagena, Murcia

The Regional Assembly of Murcia (Spanish: Asamblea Regional de Murcia) is the autonomous parliament of the Region of Murcia, one of the autonomous communities of Spain. The unicameral assembly, which contained 45 elected legislative seats, is located in the Murcian city of Cartagena, Spain.

This chamber functions include designating the President of Murcia, legislating on areas that are of autonomical jurisdiction and approving the community's budgets.

The Assembly of Murcia also designates a number of representatives to represent Murcia in the Spanish Senate, allocated by population.

== Membership ==
=== Results of the elections to the Regional Assembly of Murcia ===
The representatives of the Assembly of Murcia are elected every four years under a system of party-list proportional representation.

Since 2015, there's an only constituency, with a threshold of 3%. From 1983 to 2015, there were five constituencies, with a threshold of 5%: namely districts One, Two, Three, Four and Five.

Deputies in Regional Assembly of Murcia since 1983
Key to parties Podemos PCE IU PSOE Cs CDS PP CP AP Vox
Election	Distribution	President
1983	1 / 26 / 16	Andrés Hernández Ros (PSOE)
1987	1 / 25 / 3 / 16	Carlos Collado (PSOE)
1991	4 / 24 / 17	Carlos Collado (PSOE)
1995	4 / 15 / 26	Ramón Luis Valcárcel (PP)
1999	1 / 18 / 26	Ramón Luis Valcárcel (PP)
2003	1 / 16 / 28	Ramón Luis Valcárcel (PP)
2007	1 / 15 / 29	Ramón Luis Valcárcel (PP)
2011	1 / 11 / 33	Ramón Luis Valcárcel (PP)
2015	6 / 13 / 4 / 22	Pedro Antonio Sánchez (PP)
2019	2 / 17 / 6 / 16 / 4	Fernando López Miras (PP)
2023	2 / 13 / 21 / 9	Fernando López Miras (PP)
