= Socialist Party of the Region of Murcia =

Socialist Party of the Region of Murcia Partido Socialista de la Región de Murcia
- President: Alfonso Martínez Baños
- Secretary-General: José Vélez
- Founded: 5 August 1987 (as PSRM–PSOE)
- Headquarters: C/Princesa, 13; Murcia
- Membership (2014): 5,800
- Ideology: Social democracy
- Political position: Centre-left
- National affiliation: Spanish Socialist Workers' Party
- Congress of Deputies: 3 / 10 (Murcian seats)
- Spanish Senate: 1 / 6 (Murcian seats)
- Regional Assembly of Murcia: 17 / 45

Website
- www.psoe-regiondemurcia.com

The Socialist Party of the Region of Murcia (Spanish: Partido Socialista de la Región de Murcia, PSRM–PSOE) is the regional branch in the Region of Murcia of the Spanish Socialist Workers' Party (PSOE), main centre-left party in Spain since the 1970s. Until 1987, it was the Murcian Socialist Federation (Spanish: Federación Socialista Murciana).

== Electoral performance ==
=== Regional Assembly of Murcia ===
Regional Assembly of Murcia
Election	Votes	%	#	Seats	+/–	Leading candidate	Status in legislature
1983	238,968	52.23%	1st	26 / 43	—	Andrés Hernández Ros	Government
1987	221,377	43.71%	1st	25 / 45	1	Carlos Collado	Government
1991	234,421	45.27%	1st	24 / 45	1	Carlos Collado	Government
1995	200,133	31.74%	2nd	15 / 45	9	María Antonia Martínez	Opposition
1999	219,798	35.91%	2nd	18 / 45	3	Ramón Ortiz	Opposition
2003	221,392	34.11%	2nd	16 / 45	2	Ramón Ortiz	Opposition
2007	207,998	32.00%	2nd	15 / 45	1	Pedro Saura	Opposition
2011	155,506	23.88%	2nd	11 / 45	4	Begoña García Retegui	Opposition
2015	153,231	23.95%	2nd	13 / 45	2	Rafael González Tovar	Opposition
2019	212,600	32.47%	1st	17 / 45	4	Diego Conesa	Opposition
2023	171,271	25.60%	2nd	13 / 45	4	José Vélez	Opposition

=== Cortes Generales ===
Cortes Generales
Election	Region of Murcia						
Election	Congress					Senate	
Election	Votes	%	#	Seats	+/–	Seats	+/–
1977	155,871	34.93%	2nd	4 / 8	—	0 / 4	—
1979	178,621	39.15%	1st	4 / 8	0	3 / 4	3
1982	270,552	50.76%	1st	5 / 8	1	3 / 4	0
1986	261,922	48.85%	1st	5 / 8	0	3 / 4	0
1989	256,107	46.06%	1st	5 / 9	0	3 / 4	0
1993	253,324	38.59%	2nd	4 / 9	1	1 / 4	2
1996	266,738	37.99%	2nd	3 / 9	1	1 / 4	0
2000	217,179	32.38%	2nd	3 / 9	0	1 / 4	0
2004	252,246	35.00%	2nd	3 / 9	0	1 / 4	0
2008	251,822	32.85%	2nd	3 / 10	0	1 / 4	0
2011	154,225	20.99%	2nd	2 / 10	1	1 / 4	0
2015	147,883	20.32%	2nd	2 / 10	0	1 / 4	0
2016	144,937	20.31%	2nd	2 / 10	0	1 / 4	0
2019	190,540	24.77%	1st	3 / 10	1	2 / 4	1
2019 (Nov)	177,154	24.78%	3rd	3 / 10	0	0 / 4	2

=== European Parliament ===
European Parliament
Election	Region of Murcia		
Election	Votes	%	#
1987	229,984	45.41%	1st
1989	208,277	48.18%	1st
1994	170,300	30.97%	2nd
1999	222,743	36.37%	2nd
2004	168,050	36.36%	2nd
2009	139,897	29.83%	2nd
2014	88,617	20.73%	2nd
2019	206,015	31.95%	1st
