= Pujante =

Pujante is a surname. Notable people with the surname include:

- José Antonio Pujante (1964–2019), Spanish politician and philosophy professor
- Vicente Fernández Pujante (born 1975), Spanish footballer
