= José Bonnet =

Spanish writer, politician and astronomer (1942–2026)

José Bonnet Casciaro (1942 – 23 June 2026) was a Spanish writer, politician, science communicator, astronomer and Merchant Navy captain from Cartagena. Bonnet co-founded the regional Cantonal Party with Julio Frigard Romero, Carlos Romero Galiana, and Luís Ruipérez. In 1979, Bonnet was elected to the first Cartegena City Council during the Spanish transition to democracy.

Bonnet was a captain in the Merchant Navy. While sailing for the Merchant Navy, he developed a deep interest in astronomy from his professional experience using navigation and nautical astronomy. Beginning in the 1980s, Bonett established the Astronomical Association of Cartagena (la Asociación Astronómica de Cartagena) to promote science and astronomy in the city. He headed the Astronomical Association for decades and created conferences, programs, and courses for students and the general public. In 2012, Bonnet Casciaro opened Cartagena's new Astronomical Observatory, which includes an observatory, classrooms, and training centers.

He authored several books and publications on navigation, astronomy, and history. His works included "Cartagena 92. Indefensión y ruina", ""Pacífico. El lago español", and "La conjura de los perdedores".

Bonnet remained a proponent of Cartagena and the surrounding region. In October 2018, during a ceremony honoring members of the first democratically elected members of the Cartagena City Council, Bonnet called for cooperation to promote the interests of Cartagena.

Bonnet died on 23 June 2026, at the age of 84.
