= Visitación Martínez =

Spanish lawyer and politician

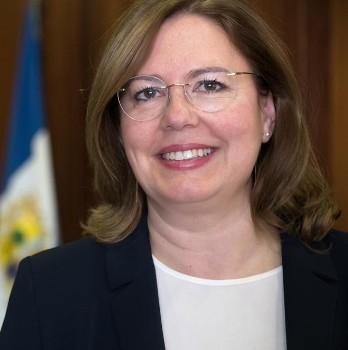

President of the Regional Assembly of Murcia
- Incumbent
- Assumed office 14 June 2023
- Preceded by: Alberto Castillo Baños

Mayor of San Pedro del Pinatar
- In office 22 May 2011 – 28 May 2023

Personal details
- Born: 27 May 1967 (age 59) San Pedro del Pinatar, Region of Murcia ,Spain
- Party: People's Party
- Education: University of Murcia
- Occupation: Politician

Visitación Martínez Martínez is a Spanish lawyer and politician from the People's Party who has been serving as the President of the Regional Assembly of Murcia since June 14, 2023.
