= Santiago Apóstol, Lorquí =

Church in Lorqui, Spain

Santiago Apóstol is an 18th-century Roman Catholic church in the town of Lorquí, in the region of Murcia, Spain.

== History ==
A church at the site was present by the 16th century. Work on the present church began in 1767 in a baroque-style, but economic difficulties, delayed completion till 1799, under the direction of Pedro Gilabert. Further refurbishment in a neoclassical-style and interior decoration continued until 1827. The belltower required repair in 1877 under the direction of Francisco Hernández Abellán. An earthquake in 1911 caused further damage.

Among the works inside the church are wooden sculptures depicting:

- Immaculate Conception attributed to Araciel brothers
- St Joseph and the child Jesus 18th century sculpture attributed to Francisco Salzillo
- Christ Nazarene attributed to Francisco Salzillo
- Virgen de los Dolores attributed to Francisco Salzillo
- St James Apostle in the main retablo
- Sacred Heart of Jesus from the 1940s
- Virgin of the Rosary from 1939
- St John Evangelist by Noguera.
- Virgin of the Light completed after the Spanish Civil War
- Christ Crucified by Concepción Cuesta
