= Lycée André Malraux de Rabat =

Lycée OSUI André Malraux
- المجموعة المدرسية أندري مالرو

Location
- Rue K’tama; 10170 Rabat; Morocco
- Coordinates: 33.970080°N 6.826748°W

Information
- Type: French International school
- Motto: Two cultures, three languages
- Established: 1997
- Principal: Pierre-Jean Bertrand
- Grades: From Preschool to 12th Grade
- Enrollment: 1,786 (2017/2018)
- Language: French, English, Arabic
- Affiliation: Mission laïque française (since 1997)
- Information: OSUI School
- Exam Preparation: French national diploma, Baccalauréat, OIB (Arabic)
- Languages taught: French, Arabic, English, Spanish
- Language Certifications: English (Cambridge English), Spanish (DELE)
- Particularities: Three-language classes starting from the second year of Nursery school (French, English, Arabic)
- Website: lyceemalraux-rabat.org

The Lycée André Malraux (Arabic: المجموعة المدرسية أندري مالرو) is a French international school in Rabat, Morocco. It was established in 1997 and is part of the Mission laïque française OSUI network. It serves levels maternelle (preschool) through terminale, the final year of lycée (senior high school) and it allows French, English and Arabic languages learning from preschool for all children. As of 2017 the school has about 1,800 students that range in age from 3 to 18 in two different campuses.

The school offers three-language classes from the middle section of kindergarten (French, English and Arabic), as well as Spanish from the 4th grade.

== See also ==
- Agency for French Education Abroad
- Education in France
- International school
- List of international schools
- Mission laïque française
- Multilingualism
- André Malraux
