= Lycée Français André Malraux de Murcie =

French international school in Spain

Lycée Français André Malraux de Murcie or Lycée Français de Murcia (Spanish: Liceo francés de Murcia) is a French international school in Molina de Segura, Murcia Province, Spain.

It opened in 1987, and it has 650 students as of 2016. The school serves levels maternelle (preschool) through lycée (senior high school/sixth form college).

== See also ==
- Liceo Español Luis Buñuel, a Spanish international school near Paris, France
- Universidad Popular de Cartagena
