= José Antonio Pujante =

Spanish politician (1964–2019)

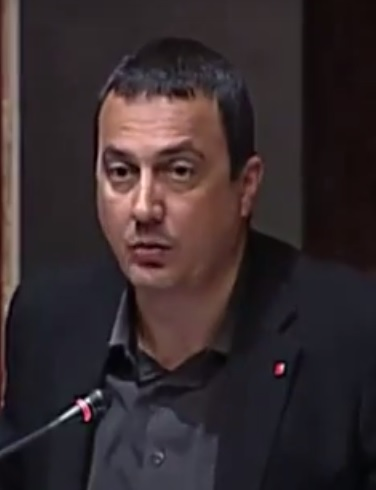
- Pujante in 2014

Member of the Regional Assembly of Murcia
- In office 27 May 2007 – 1 January 2019

Personal details
- Born: José Antonio Pujante Diekmann; 10 December 1964; Villefranche-de-Rouergue, France
- Died: 1 January 2019 (aged 54); Murcia, Spain
- Political party: United Left–Greens of the Region of Murcia; United Left
- Education: University of Murcia
- Occupation: Politician; Philosophy professor

José Antonio Pujante Diekmann (10 December 1964 – 1 January 2019) was a Spanish politician and philosophy professor. Pujante, a regional coordinator for the United Left–Greens of the Region of Murcia, served as a deputy of the Regional Assembly of Murcia from 2007 until his death in office in 2019.

Pujante died of a heart attack on the morning of 1 January 2019 in Murcia, at the age of 54.
