= Andrés Hernández Ros =

Spanish politician (1948–2016)

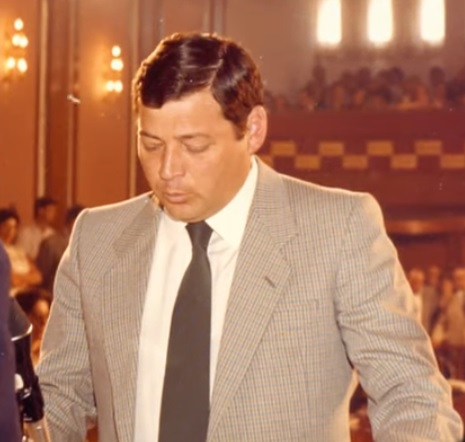

President of the Region of Murcia
- In office July 22, 1982 – March 29, 1983
- Preceded by: Office created
- Succeeded by: Carlos Collado

President of the Regional Council of Murcia
- In office May 5, 1979 – July 22, 1982
- Preceded by: Antonio Pérez Crespo
- Succeeded by: Office abolished

Personal details
- Born: Andrés Hernández Ros; July 30, 1948 Guadalupe, Region of Murcia, Spain
- Died: June 26, 2016 (aged 67) Murcia, Region of Murcia, Spain
- Party: PSOE (PSOE)
- Spouse(s): Josefa Cebrián (?-?; divorced); María Elena Sarmiento (?–1994; separated)
- Children: Four

Andrés Hernández Ros (July 30, 1948 – June 26, 2016) was a Spanish politician and member of the Spanish Socialist Workers' Party (PSOE) from the Region of Murcia. Hernández served as the first President of the Region of Murcia from July 1982 until March 9, 1984, following the establishment of autonomy in 1982. Prior to autonomy, he held the office of President of Regional Council, the head of the pre-autonomous government of Murcia, from May 5, 1979, until July 1982.

Hernández Ros, who was a chemist by profession, first joined the Spanish Socialist Workers' Party (PSOE) in 1974 and became the PSOE secretary in 1977. On May 1, 1978, he was elected party Secretary General following the merger of the PSOE with the People's Socialist Party, which had been led by Enrique Tierno Galván.

In 1979, Andrés Hernández Ros was nominated as the PSOE candidate for President of the President of Regional Council of Murcia, which was the per-autonomous body which governed Murcia prior to the creation of the autonomous community in 1982. Hernández was elected President of the Regional Council on May 5, 1979. He held the office from May 5, 1979, until July 1982.

Andrés Hernández Ros became the first President of the Region of Murcia, or head of government, in July 1982 following the creation of the Autonomous community that same year. He served as Murcia's first President of the Region from July 1982 until March 9, 1984.

Hernández Ros resigned from the Presidency of the Region on March 9, 1984, in the wake of a bribery scandal. He had been accused of allegedly bribing two journalists from the La Verdad newspaper in exchange for not criticising him in the newspaper. Though he resigned as President, Hernández retained his seat in the Regional Assembly of Murcia until the end of the legislature in 1987, when he retired from politics.

Hernández Ros had four children with his first wife, Josefa Cebrián; the marriage ended in divorce. In 1988, he married and moved to Chile with his second wife, María Elena Sarmiento, a Chilean. Hernández owned and operated a sawmill near Temuco and a Spanish restaurant in Santiago, Chile. He and his second wife, María Elena Sarmiento, separated in 1994.

He returned to politics only once, when he attended a 1994 PSOE meeting to elect delegates in support of Prime Minister Felipe González. In 2012, Hernández Ros was awarded the Gold Medal of the Region of Murcia (la Medalla de Oro de la Región de Murcia), the highest honor awarded by the autonomous government of Murcia.

Andrés Hernández Ros died on June 26, 2016, at the age of 67.
