= Communist Party of the Region of Murcia =

Communist Party of the Region of Murcia (in Spanish: Partido Comunista de la Región de Murcia) is the federation of the Communist Party of Spain (PCE) in Murcia.
