= Molina de Segura =

- Municipality
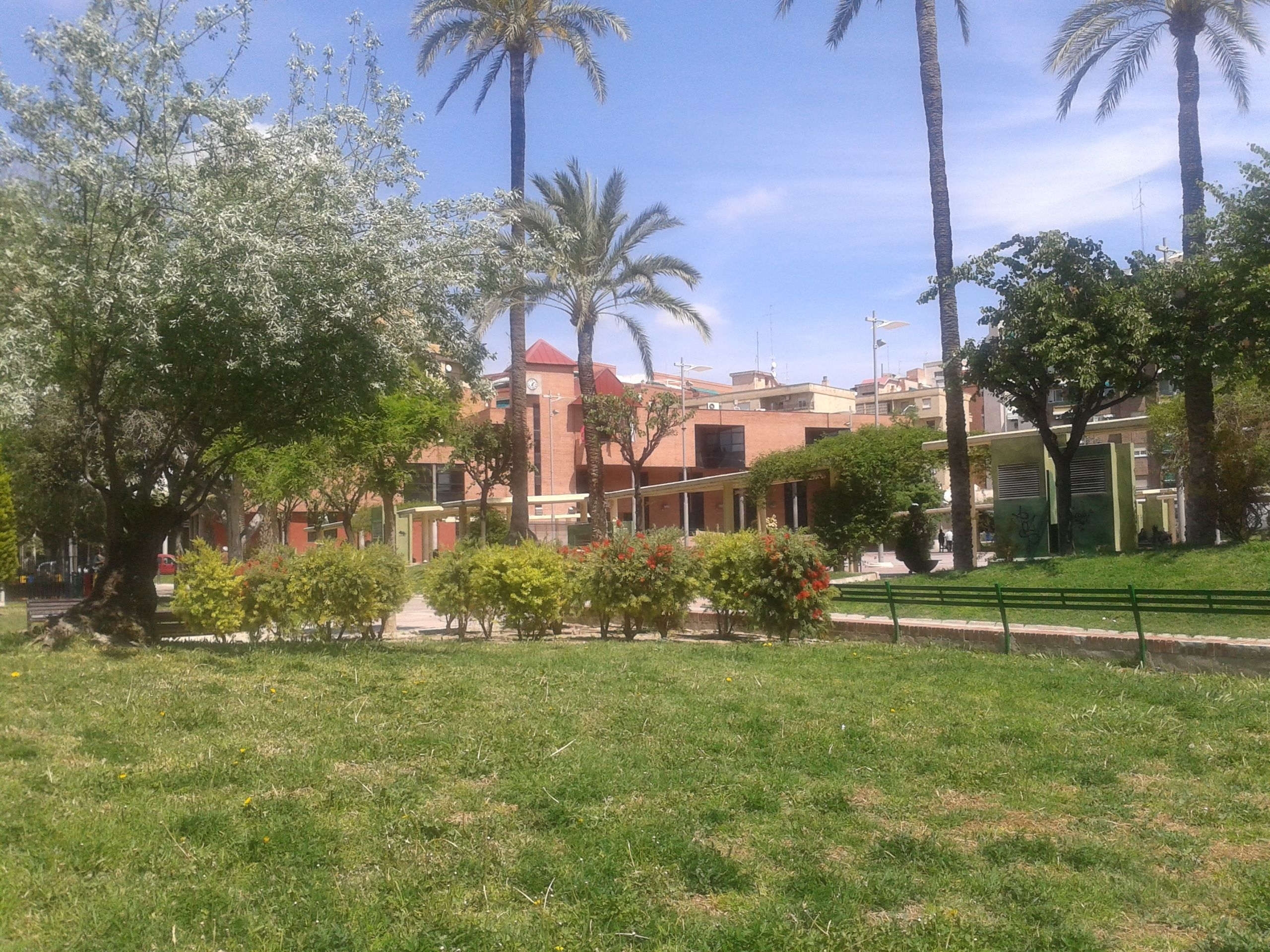

- Flag Coat of arms

- Location in Murcia Location in Spain
- Country: Spain
- A. community: Murcia
- Province: Murcia
- Comarca: Vega Media del Segura
- Municipality: Molina de Segura

Government
  - Mayor: Eliseo García Cantó

Area
  - Total: 169 km^{2} (65 sq mi)
- Elevation: 125 m (410 ft)

Population (2025-01-01)
  - Total: 78,458
  - Density: 464/km^{2} (1,200/sq mi)
- Website: Official website

Molina de Segura is a municipality of Spain in the autonomous community and province of Murcia. It is located 10 km from the provincial capital, Murcia.

It borders the towns of Las Torres de Cotillas, Alguazas, Lorquí, Ulea, Archena, Abarán, Blanca, Murcia and Fortuna. It has the fourth largest population in the region after Murcia, Cartagena and Lorca, with over 60,000 inhabitants. It is located 10 km north of the capital. The N-301 highway, that runs from Madrid to Cartagena, passes through it.

The town has a line of walls dating to the Almohad era (11th-13th centuries).

Molina de Segura is home to confectionery makers Vidal Golosinas, Jake S.A. and Sánchez Cano (also known as Fini).

== History ==
=== From the Prehistory to the Middle Ages ===
There is evidence of human presence in the municipality from the Middle Paleolithic that consists in a site named Las Toscas-El Chorico. Molina de Segura was also inhabited by people belonging to the Argaric civilisation. One group of remains is located in a hill in the east end of the territory. As a matter of fact, it also covers part of its adjacent municipality Fortuna. The site was originated in the Chalcolithic. There are some groups of remains corresponding to the Iberians. One site occurs in the northern half and the other in the east end.

The Romans ruled large part of the Iberian gradually since 209 BC. They left in Molina de Segura a via or road that connected Carthago Nova (Cartagena) to Complutum (in the current Alcalá de Henares in Madrid) and another one that connected Elche with Cieza. Apart from those viae, they caused the existence of more remains.

There was a war in which Muslim peoples were involved with ruling the peninsula purposes and it began in 711. The Visigothic king Theodemir and the governor of North Africa Abd al-Aziz ibn Musa signed the Treaty of Orihuela. It established Muslim sovereignty in the southeast of Spain, that includes the current municipality Molina de Segura. They built an alcazaba (Moorish fortification) in the early 11th century. It was part of a spot that was surrounded with walls. According to Arabic travellers, the territory was a crossroads. Besides, the main town, there was a settlement of that era.

In 1243, the king of Taifa of Murcia signed the Treaty of Alcaraz. Consequently the former Taifa of Murcia would become part of the Crown of Castile. This condition was effective in Molina from 1266. The new kingdom of Murcia was repopulated during the following decades and this current municipality was part of that fact. The nobleman Alonso Fajardo granted excellent condition to the people from Christian kingdoms who moved to Molina de Segura with a document named Carta Puebla in 1396. The territory was named Molina Seca (Dry Molina) in documents related to Christian kingdoms.

The current municipality passed on several owners until it belonged to the nobleman Juan Manuel. There are remains that Juan Manuel fortified the fortification. The population of Molina increased during the last centuries of the Middle Ages. After the death of Juan Manuel, Molina received vicissitudes caused by the desires of some possible owners. Finally, it was ruled by the Crown directly during the reign of Henry II of Castile. When Henri III of Castile was the king, the adelantado (governor) Alfonso Yánez Fajardo was bestowed the territory.

=== Early modern and late modern periods ===
The social and administrative structures didn't vary considerably from the beginning of the Early Modern Period until the Spanish confiscation. There was a significant decrease in population and economy was adversely affected owing to the expulsion of Jews in 1492.

Two disasters occurred in the mid-17th century: a plague epidemic in 1648, and a flood in 1651. After the flood, the irrigation system was formed again. As a result, there was an increase in agriculture matters and in population and it reached the highest level during the 18th century. The agriculture received modernisation in the vegetables and mulberry areas. The mulberry conditions lead to a splendour in the silk produced in Molina. The apogee also affected the town and a specific phenomenon of that is the construction of Nuestra Señora de la Asunción Church in 1765.

In the second half of the 19th century, tinning economic activities of the grown products started in Molina, but they were performed in a crafted way during the first decades. During that era there was a prevalence of the windmill industry.

In 1916, the municipality started to have Molina de Segura as its name.

Before the second half of the 20th century, the economy was based on agriculture and ranching. The most grown products were the peach, the apricot, the onions, the peppers, the tomatoes, some cereals, the almonds and the grapes. The most used animals in ranching were the sheep. The food tinning industry was developed during the first half of the century and that fact lead to a economy transformation in which it became mainly industrial. This industry reached its apogee in the 1940s, then Molina became one of the major tinning industry spot nationwide and even worldwide.

During the 1990s the industry suffered an important crisis and some factories were forced to close. The secondary sector was diversified as a consequence.

== Geography ==
The town of Molina de Segura is located in Europe, in the east of the Iberian Peninsula, belonging to the kingdom of Spain, and part of the Region of Murcia. The township has an area of 169 km^{2} with flora and fauna belonging to the very dry Mediterranean climate (340 mm of rainfall per year) to which it belongs. Some landforms in the municipality are Sierra de la Espada (a mountain range) and Rambla del Chorillo.

== Human geography ==
The three major districts, La Ribera de Molina, Torrealta and El Llano de Molina, all exceed one thousand inhabitants and are the important Orchard Molina, tracing its emergence in the Arab stage, with the government of Murcia by Ibn Mardanis, 12th century. There is a long tradition of huerta, roughly translated kitchen gardens, in the region that are grouped into the inherited irrigation. They water the garden and Subirana Mayor ditches. Its main products are the peach, apricot and vegetables, and its famous tomatoes, onions and peppers.

The smaller hamlets, Fenazar, Valientes (The brave), Campotéjar Alta, Campotéjar Baja, Comala, La Espada (The Sword), Rellano (Landing), Albarda, La hornera and Romeral are on dry land with little production of cereals, olives and sheep. Esparto predominates, thyme and rosemary. They are the Sierra de la Espada, the Place and La Pila. In the Campotéjar, in recent years there have been significant changes rainfed to irrigated with the water supply of the Tajo-Segura, highlighting Campotéjar Irrigation Community. Its main crops are fruit trees of high quality, whose destinations are the European markets.

== Economy ==
23.7% of the territory is utilised with grown purposes. and the most widely grown products are the citrus and the apricots. Approximately 15% of the agreements were related to agriculture and fishing activities in 2019. 10.06% of the workers signed agreements to work as labourers. 17.75% of the agreements were written for posts in industry sector and 7.86% were signed by labourers. Almost 60.2% of the agreements were related to the tertiary sector in 2019 and 11.44% of the agreements were signed by waiters.

== Main sights ==
- Remains of the medieval rampart
- Casa Cárcel: Its construction ended in 1604, but it was remodelled in the 18th century for the first time and in the 1980s for the second.
- Nuestra Señora de la Asunción Parish Church: It is placed in the centre of Molina. It was opened up in 1765. It has a Latin cross plan, which includes a nave and two aisles. Its facade is formed mainly with stone blocks and bricks also occur in the building. There is a fresco in the inner part of the dome.
- Sagrado Corazón Church: This building was built in 1833.
- San Roque Church: It was built from 1835 to 1850.
- Nuestra Señora de Las Mercedes Church: It was opened up in 1910. Its bell tower is eclectic and the building has neoclassic features.
- María Auxiliadora Church:
- La Purísima Church: It is located in El Llano district in the east and southern half of the municipality. It was opened up in 1967.
- Casa del Canónigo: It dates back to the 19th century. Its name is due to the fact that it belonged to a canon (the translation for canónigo).
- Some chimneys: These are traces of the food tinning industrial era in Molina.
- Ethnographic Museum Carlos Soriano

== Festivities ==
Some festivities that are held in the municipality are listed below:

- San Antón: This festivity occurs in January
- Holy Week:
- Patron saint festivities: These festive days take place in September. There are several activities such as opening address, a folklore fest, a firework display, a float parade, a car model exhibition. There are also religious activities such as masses, processions (festive religious parades), romerías and rosary prays; and sport activities such as a rhythmic gymnastics exhibit, a bicycle tour, badminton tournaments, soccer tournaments, and so force.
- From Christmas to the Epiphany Day

== Transportation ==
From Murcia Molina de Segura can be reached by two motorways, one direct and one urban population that surrounds and connects the Mediterranean motorway. It has a train to Madrid, from next Alguazas. The airports of Alicante and San Javier and the seaport of Cartagena are located half an hour away by car.

== Education ==
Lycée Français André Malraux de Murcie, a French international school, is in the city.

== See also ==
- List of municipalities in the Region of Murcia
