= Cantonal Party =

Cantonal Party Partido Cantonal
- President: Luis Carlos García Conesa
- Secretary-General: Salvador Sánchez Cerón
- Founded: 1977
- Headquarters: Plaza del Rey, 1. 30201 Cartagena
- Ideology: Cantonalism; Federalism

Website
- www.partidocantonal.com

The Cantonal Party (Spanish: Partido Cantonal, PCAN) is a Spanish cantonalist political party based in Cartagena, co-founded in 1977 by Julio Frigard Romero, Carlos Romero Galiana, José Bonnet Casciaro, and Luís Ruipérez.

The Cantonal Party was a founding member of the political federation Citizens' Movement of Cartagena.
