= Carlos Collado =

Spanish politician (born 1938)

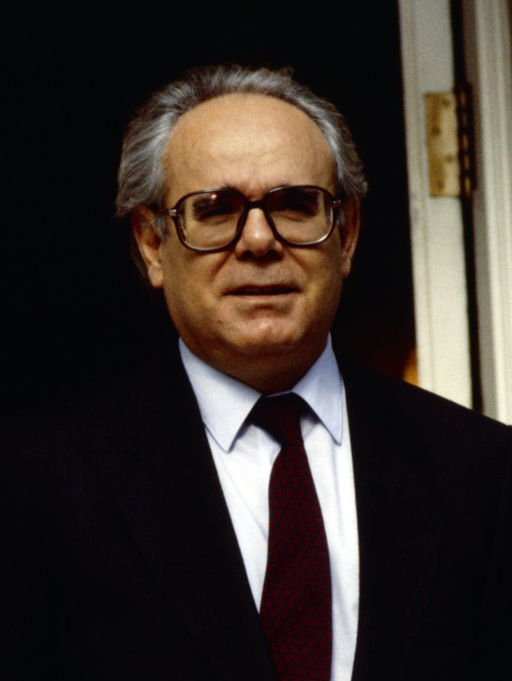

President of the Region of Murcia
- In office 31 March 1984 – 16 April 1993
- Preceded by: Andrés Hernández Ros
- Succeeded by: María Antonia Martínez

Personal details
- Born: Carlos Collado Mena; July 12, 1938 Orléans, France
- Party: PSOE

Carlos Collado Mena (born 12 July 1938) is a Spanish politician and member of the Spanish Socialist Workers' Party (PSOE) from the Region of Murcia who served as the second President of the Region of Murcia from March 1984 to April 1993.
