= Ojós =

- Municipality
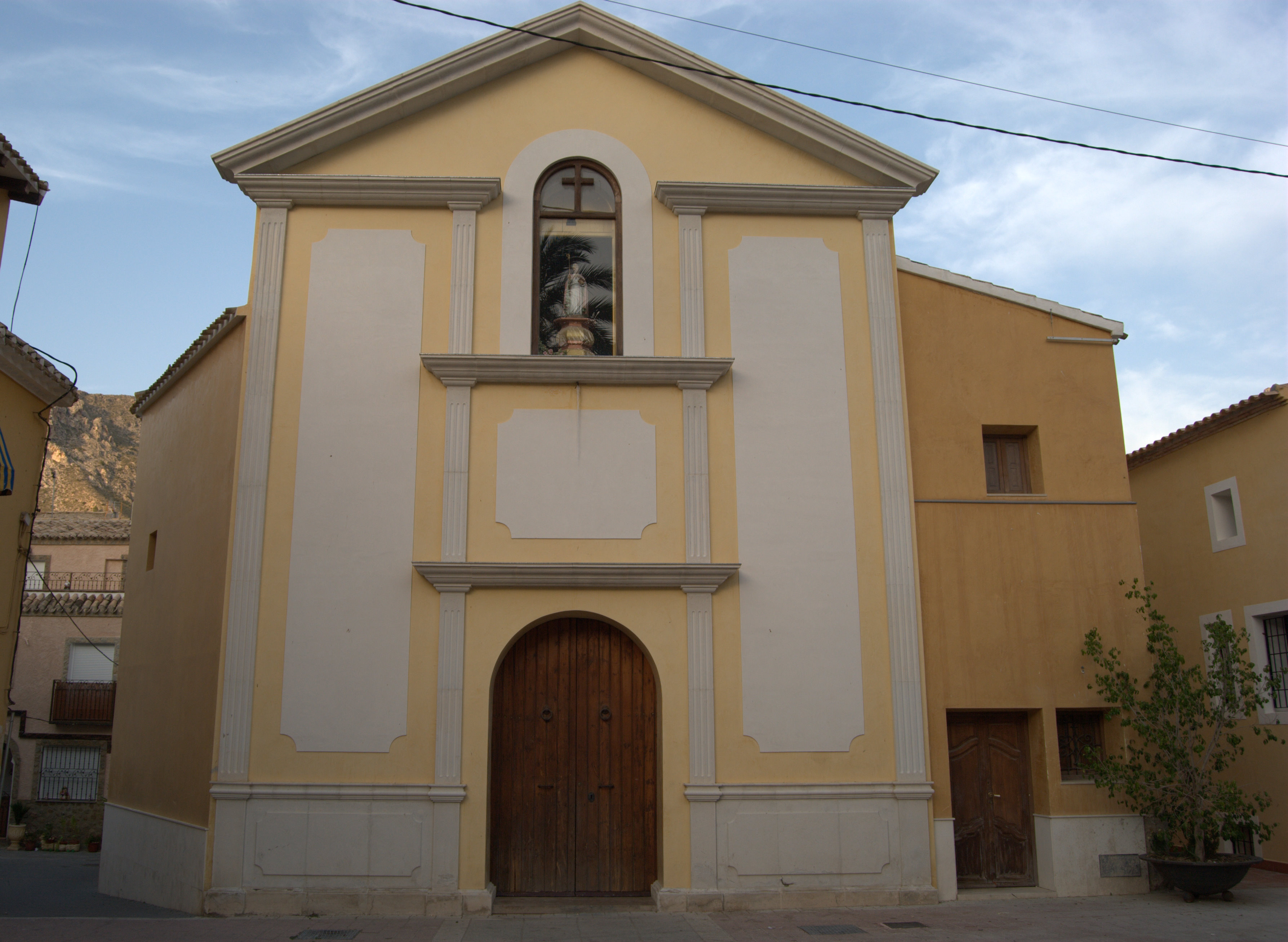

- Flag Coat of arms

- Location in Murcia

- Location in Murcia Location in Spain
- Country: Spain
- Autonomous community: Murcia
- Province: Murcia
- Comarca: Río Mulal
- Judicial party: Cieza

Government
  - Mayor: Pablo Melgarejo

Area
  - Total: 45.28 km^{2} (17.48 sq mi)
- Elevation: 132 m (433 ft)

Population (2025-01-01)
  - Total: 548
  - Density: 12.1/km^{2} (31.3/sq mi)
- Time zone: UTC+1 (CET)
  - Summer (DST): UTC+2 (CEST)
- Website: Official website

Ojós (Spanish: [oˈxos]) is a municipality in the autonomous community of Murcia in southeastern Spain. It is located in the northern half of the region, has an area of 45.3 km ^{2} and shares borders with Blanca at its north, Ulea at its north-east, Villanueva del Río Segura at its East, Campos del Río at is south-west and Ricote at its north-west. The municipality was inhabited by 500 people in 2019.

== History ==
The municipality was inhabited in the Late Roman era, as an archaeological site proves. It was a fortified small town on a hillside.

A specially noteworthy period of Ojós is during the Muslim Iberian Peninsula era, after the conquest in the year 711. The toponym of the city may have been originated in that era, and the Castle of Alarbona or Peñascales was built then. The Kingdom of Murcia, where the town belonged, was reconquered in the 13th century by Christian armies and the Treaty of Alcaraz took place in 1243. The treaty involved a supremacy of Castilian monarch over the kingdom and the main fortresses were under the power of the Christians, but Castille had to protect and respect the Muslims who lived in the conquered lands. In 1264 there was a Mudejar revoult in the Kingdom of Murcia because of a lack of observance of the terms of the treaty.

During the early period of the Christian era, there was a phenomenon named encomienda, that is literally translated as entrusting, of the Order of Santiago in the territory. Encomienda consists that the conquerors are rewardaded by the labour of conquered people, but in theory, they would provide with protection and education. During the 15th century the territory was 'encommended' by various people, and some of them belonged to the highest nobility of the kingdom. Conversions to Christianity from mudejars were frequent in that era.

The rest of the mudejars were expelled between the years 1609 and 1611 because of a decree of the king Philip III and the town was affected because of the consequent lack of workforce. From the kingdom of Murcia, the expulsion was tried to be ceased, but it was impending in 1611.

== Demographics ==
There was a 0.2% of foreigners in 2019. The table below shows the population trends in the 20th and 21st centuries.

	1900	1910	1920	1930	1940	1950	1960	1970	1981	1991	2011	2011
Population	1,266	1,374	1,308	1,227	1,384	1,173	1,193	888	647	678	579	578

== Economy ==
Agriculture is highly performed in Ojós. 22.7% of the surface is occupied with crop lands and a large majority are planted with trees. The most widely grown products are the apricots, the lemons and the almonds. 69.54% of the agreements were signed for workers of the agricultural and fishing sectors in 2019 and 27.58% for jobs of the service sector.

== See also ==
- List of municipalities in the Region of Murcia
