= Cieza, Murcia =

Cieza
- Municipality
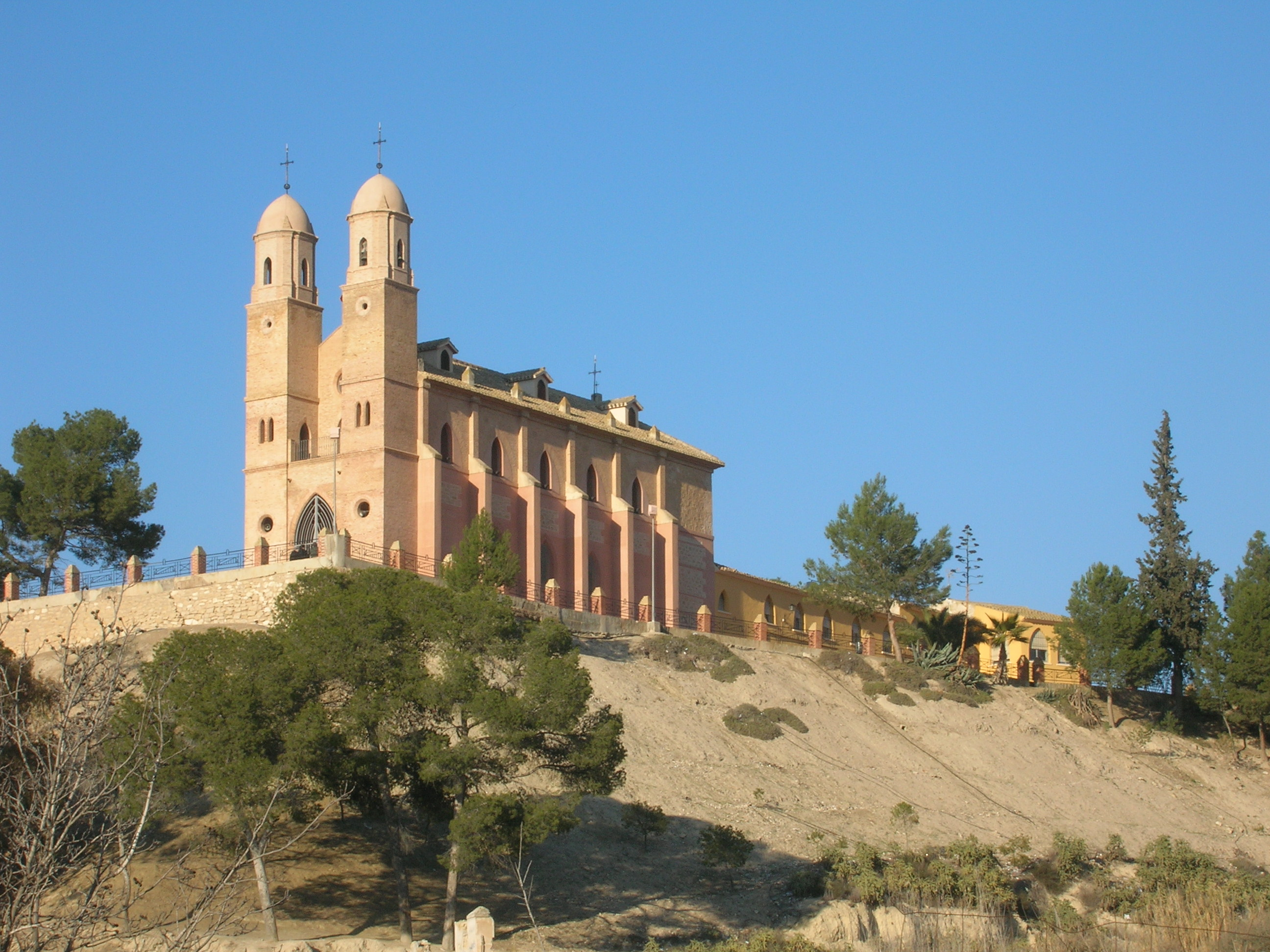
- Christ the Consoler hermitage

- Flag Coat of arms

- Location in Murcia

- Location in Murcia Location in Spain
- Country: Spain
- Community: Murcia
- Province: Murcia

Government
  - Mayor: Tomás Rubio Carrillo

Area
  - Total: 365.1 km^{2} (141.0 sq mi)
- Elevation: 188 m (617 ft)

Population (2025-01-01)
  - Total: 35,577
  - Density: 97.44/km^{2} (252.4/sq mi)
- Demonym: Ciezanos
- Time zone: UTC+1 (CET)
  - Summer (DST): UTC+2 (CEST)
- Postal code: 30530
- Website: Official website

Cieza (Spanish pronunciation: [ˈθje.θa]) is a town and municipality in Spain, in the autonomous community of Murcia. It is the capital of the Vega Alta comarca, an old form of provincial subdivision). Its current population consisted of 34,889 inhabitants in the year 2018. The Segura River passes by the town.

Its economy is based on agriculture, mainly in the cultivation of peaches and olives, but industry is also important, since 4,000 people work in that sector. The public sector, transport and tourism are also very important in the local economy.

== Main sights ==
Populated since the Paleolithic Age, the area of Cieza is home to archaeological excavations in the Cañón de Almadenes such as Cueva del Arco and La Serreta; and Barranco de los Grajos.

There are also Iberian remains (found at Bolvax), as well as Roman, Visigothic, and Arabic deposits. The Arabs, who inhabited the area from the eleventh to thirteenth centuries, and who knew the area as Medina Siyâsa, left behind a mountain fortress. At the dig site of Medina Siyâsa, many decorative architectural elements have been found, such as engraved arches and porticos, and polychromed ceramics, glass, metals, etc. All these discoveries are kept in the museum of Siyâsa.

The Ermita ("hermitage") de la Virgen del Buen Suceso is located in the area known as Collado de la Atalaya. The Plaza de España is located in the heart of the city. The modern market was built in 1929 by Julio Carrilero.

El Paseo ("The Walkway") contains pictorial work in glazed tile by José Lucas, who dedicated the different tiles to several men of letters.

The main church is the eighteenth-century Basílica de la Asunción. Inside, there are sculptures and retablos by Rafael Ximeno y Planes, Ignacio Pinazo Martínez, José González Moreno, Francisco Romero Zafra, etc.

The Iglesia de San Joaquín, dating from the seventeenth century, used to be a Franciscan monastery in the past. The church-monastery of the Order of Poor Ladies (Clarisas), from the eighteenth century is also an important monument.

Other important sites include the main market, which was built in 1929, and "El Muro" (The Wall), built in the nineteenth century in the place where the medieval wall was located.

== Facilities ==
- Sport facilities – In Cieza there are several swimming pools -including a covered and heated one-, several basketball and tennis courts, two football fields, an athletics track, several gyms.
- Theaters – There are several theatres in the town (some of them are theatres and cinemas at the same time). They are called Auditorio Aurelio Guirao, Auditorio Gabriel Celaya and Teatro Capitol.
- Education – In Cieza there are two secondary schools, seven primary schools, a music college, a special education school, several nursery schools, two catholic schools and two schools which are run by private companies but financed by the regional government.
- Health – There is a public hospital which provides health care not only for Cieza but also for people who live in other towns and villages. There are also two public clinics as well as some private ones.
- Judiciary – The town is head of a judicial district (in Spanish, partido judicial). As a result of that, there are first instance courts in the town.
- Museums – There are some museums and art galleries. The best-known art gallery is Casa Efe Serrano. The most popular museum is Medina Siyasa Museum, which shows objects related to local history.

== Climate ==
Cieza has a cold semi-arid climate (Köppen climate classification: BSk) bordering on a hot semi-arid climate (Köppen: BSh) with mild winters and hot summers. Rainfall is scarce throughout the year, with September being the wettest month of the year, with 44 mm. Frosty days occasionally occur in winter, while temperatures above 35 °C (95 °F) are common, and can exceed 40 °C (104 °F) on days of intense heat.

Climate data for Cieza (1997–2020), extremes (1997-present)
Month	Jan	Feb	Mar	Apr	May	Jun	Jul	Aug	Sep	Oct	Nov	Dec	Year
Record high °C (°F)	28.0 (82.4)	27.4 (81.3)	32.9 (91.2)	35.9 (96.6)	40.6 (105.1)	41.5 (106.7)	44.2 (111.6)	45.3 (113.5)	42.9 (109.2)	35.0 (95.0)	29.3 (84.7)	29.2 (84.6)	45.3 (113.5)
Mean daily maximum °C (°F)	15.2 (59.4)	16.8 (62.2)	20.0 (68.0)	22.2 (72.0)	26.2 (79.2)	31.2 (88.2)	34.0 (93.2)	34.1 (93.4)	30.0 (86.0)	25.3 (77.5)	18.8 (65.8)	15.5 (59.9)	24.1 (75.4)
Daily mean °C (°F)	9.4 (48.9)	10.7 (51.3)	13.5 (56.3)	15.8 (60.4)	19.3 (66.7)	23.9 (75.0)	26.7 (80.1)	27.0 (80.6)	23.4 (74.1)	19.1 (66.4)	13.1 (55.6)	10.0 (50.0)	17.7 (63.8)
Mean daily minimum °C (°F)	3.5 (38.3)	4.6 (40.3)	7.0 (44.6)	9.4 (48.9)	12.5 (54.5)	16.6 (61.9)	19.3 (66.7)	19.9 (67.8)	16.8 (62.2)	12.8 (55.0)	7.3 (45.1)	4.4 (39.9)	11.2 (52.1)
Record low °C (°F)	−6.5 (20.3)	−4.2 (24.4)	−2.5 (27.5)	1.7 (35.1)	4.1 (39.4)	10.2 (50.4)	13.8 (56.8)	13.4 (56.1)	9.9 (49.8)	3.1 (37.6)	−2.4 (27.7)	−4.5 (23.9)	−6.5 (20.3)
Average precipitation mm (inches)	18.2 (0.72)	12.5 (0.49)	26.9 (1.06)	35.3 (1.39)	24.1 (0.95)	12.7 (0.50)	2.1 (0.08)	8.4 (0.33)	44.3 (1.74)	26.2 (1.03)	31.8 (1.25)	27.5 (1.08)	270 (10.62)
Average precipitation days (≥ 1 mm)	2.6	2.1	3.8	4.3	3.9	1.4	0.5	1.5	3.4	3.5	4.4	3.5	34.9
Average relative humidity (%)	63	58	55	55	51	48	49	52	59	62	63	65	57
Source: Agencia Estatal de Meteorologia

== Economy ==
A third of the territory is utilised for crop purposes and the most widely grown product is the apricot.

== Celebrations ==
The Holy Week celebrations (processions) are the main fiestas. They are Fiestas of National Tourist Interest. Saint Bartholomew fiestas are also important fiestas, as well as the Moros y cristianos.

== Twin towns ==
- Baler, Philippines
- Cieza, Spain

== See also ==
- List of municipalities in the Region of Murcia
