= Lorquí =

- Municipality
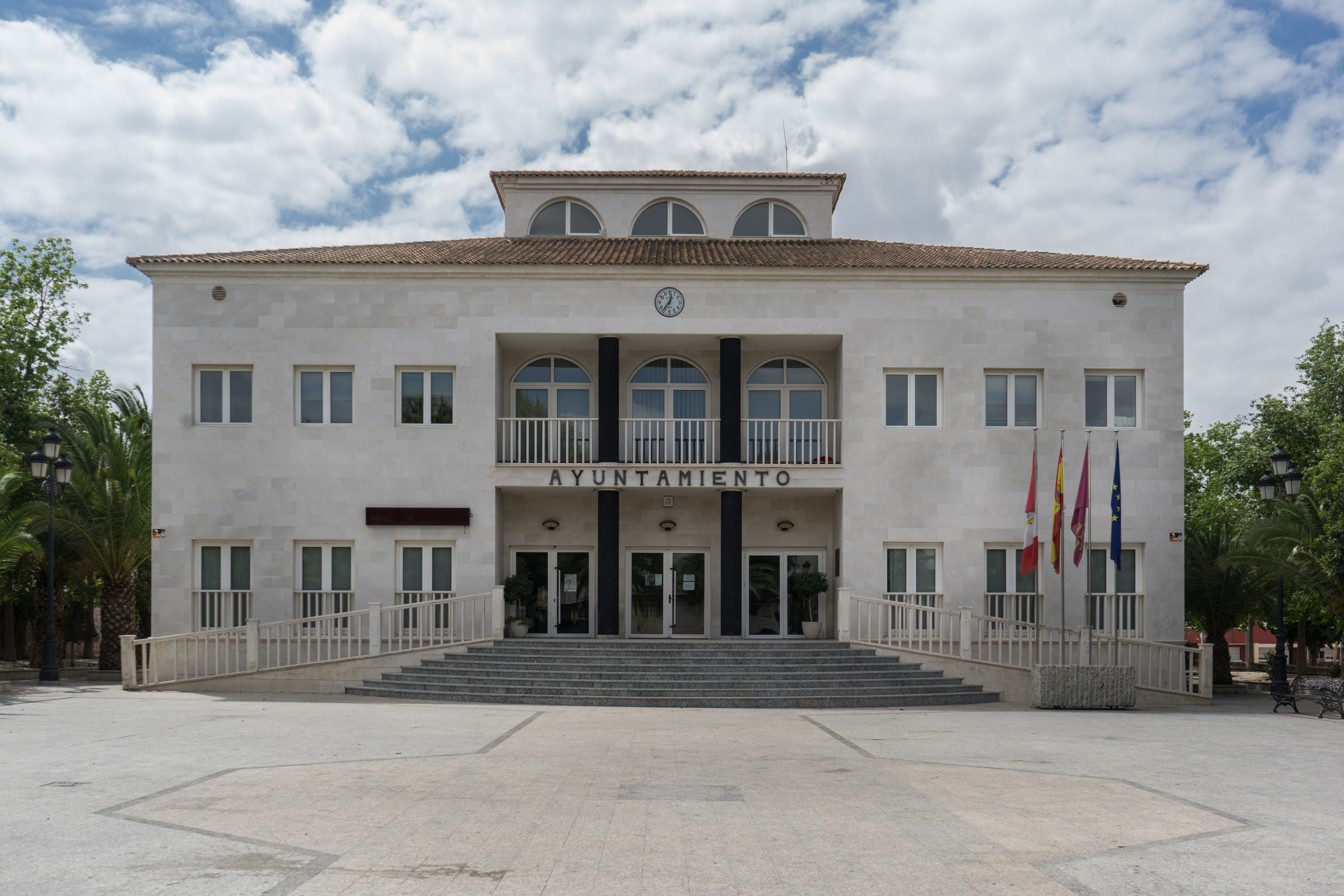

- Coat of arms

- Location in Murcia Location in Spain
- Country: Spain
- Autonomous community: Murcia
- Comarca: Vega Alta del Segura
- Parish: Molina de Segura

Government
  - Mayor: Jesús Gómez Montiel (PSRM/PSOE)

Area
  - Total: 15 km^{2} (5.8 sq mi)
- Elevation: 89 m (292 ft)

Population (2025-01-01)
  - Total: 7,946
- Post code: 30550
- Area code: 968
- Website: Official website

Lorquí is a Spanish municipality in the autonomous community of Murcia. It has a population of 6,493 (2006) and an area of 15 km^{2} .

== Demographics ==
The population of Lorquí has more than quadrupled since 1900 and continues to grow at a fast pace, growing 18% from 1991 to 2005.

== Sports ==
The community enjoys soccer games at the Juan de la Cierva stadium, completed in 2002, which can seat 2,000 spectators. The stadium is home to the Club de Fútbol Atlético Ciudad. The 18th-century church of Santiago Apostol is also in the town.

== See also ==
- List of municipalities in the Region of Murcia
