= Second government of Fernando López Miras =

2nd government of Fernando López Miras
- Government of the Region of Murcia
- 2019–present
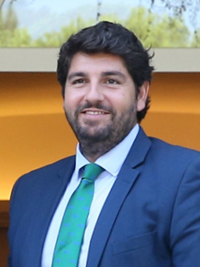
- Date formed: 1 August 2019
- Date dissolved: 14 September 2023

People and organisations
- Monarch: Felipe VI
- President: Fernando López Miras
- Vice President: Isabel Franco
- No. of ministers: 10 (Note: Does not include the President.) (2019–2021); 9 (2021–2022); 8 (2022–present)
- Total no. of members: 17
- Member party: PP; Cs (2019–2021)
- Status in legislature: Minority coalition government (2019–2021); Minority government (2021–present)
- Opposition party: PSOE
- Opposition leader: Diego Conesa (2019–2021); José Vélez (2021–present)

History
- Election: 2019 regional election
- Legislature term: 10th Regional Assembly
- Predecessor: López Miras I
- Successor: López Miras III

The second government of Fernando López Miras was formed on 1 August 2019, following the latter's election as President of the Region of Murcia by the Regional Assembly of Murcia on 26 July and his swearing-in on 29 July, as a result of the People's Party (PP) allying itself with Citizens (Cs) and mustering the external support from Vox in exchange for policy compromises following the 2019 Murcian regional election. It succeeded the first López Miras government and has been the incumbent government of the Region of Murcia since 1 August 2019, a total of 2,429 days, or 6 years, 7 months and 25 days.

Until March 2021, the cabinet comprised members of the PP and Cs as well as a number of independents, to become the first coalition government to be formed in the region. From that point onwards, the government has been formed by the PP and a number of expelled members from both Cs and Vox.

== Investiture ==
Investiture; Fernando López Miras (PP)
Ballot →	26 July 2019
Required majority →	23 out of 45
Yes: • PP (16); • Cs (6); • Vox (4)	26 / 45
No: • PSOE (16); • Podemos–Equo (2)	18 / 45
Abstentions	0 / 45
Absentees: • PSOE (1)	1 / 45

== Cabinet changes ==
López Miras's second government saw a number of cabinet changes during its tenure:

- On 20 January 2021, López Miras announced the resignation of his health minister, Manuel Villegas, after a scandal broke out over the latter's unduly receiving a dose of the COVID-19 vaccine, skipping the legally-established vaccination protocols and procedures. He was replaced in the post on 23 January by Juan José Pedreño.
- On 18 February 2021, transparency, participation and public administration minister Beatriz Ballesteros announced her resignation citing the "loss of confidence" from the new regional leadership of the party that proposed her, Cs. The resignation was effective from 20 February. Ballesteros was replaced in her post by José Gabriel Sánchez Torregrosa on 23 February.
- On 10 March 2021, both the Spanish Socialist Workers' Party (PSOE) and Cs announced an agreement under which they would jointly bring down the PP governments in the city and the region of Murcia. In response, López Miras expelled Ana Martínez Vidal and José Gabriel Sánchez Torregrosa, as members from Cs's regional leadership, but preserved two of the party's members in the government in hopes of securing their support to thwart the no-confidence motion. On 12 March, López Miras and Isabel Franco announced an agreement whereby three out of the six Cs deputies in the region—Franco, María del Valle Miguélez and Francisco Álvarez García—would back the government in exchange for minister positions, which were formalized the next day. In response, Cs expelled all its four remaining members in the government from the party.
- On 3 April 2021, López Miras secured the parliamentary support of several rebel Vox deputies by appointing María Isabel Campuzano as new Education and Culture minister, in a government reorganization that also saw mayor of Yecla Marcos Ortuño being elected to the new presidency, Tourism and Sports portfolio and Javier Celdrán's powers being restructured into the Economy, Finance and Digital Administration ministry.
- On 7 April 2021, Francisco Álvarez García announced his resignation as minister of Employment, Research and Universities, in order to take over the control of the Citizens's parliamentary group in the Regional Assembly of Murcia, with his portfolio being merged with that of Business and Industry minister and Spokesperson María del Valle Miguélez.
- On 18 November 2021, the Transparency, Participation and Public Administration portfolio was reorganized into the Transparency, Security and Emergencies ministry.
- On 8 February 2022, as a result of a government crisis caused by Education minister María Isabel Campuzano over her dismissal of Institute of Cultural and Arts Industries director-general, José Ramón Palazón (a trusted person of one of the Vox expelled deputies that maintained their support to the López Miras government), her portfolio was stripped of its Culture competences, which were transferred and merged into the new presidency, Tourism, Culture and Sports ministry.
- On 11 May 2022, the Minister of Transparency, Security and Emergencies, Antonio Sánchez Lorente, resigned from his post because of personal health reasons. As a result, this Ministry was disestablished and its competences transferred to the restructured Ministries of Women, Equality, LGTBI, Families, Social Policy and Transparency (led by Isabel Franco) and Water, Agriculture, Livestock, Fisheries, Environment and Emergencies (led by Antonio Luengo).

== Council of Government ==
The Council of Government is structured into the offices for the president of the Region of Murcia, the vice president and a number of ministries (10 from August 2019 to April 2021, 9 from April 2021 to May 2022 and 8 from May 2022).

← López Miras II Government → (1 August 2019 – present)
Portfolio	Name	Party	Took office	Left office	Ref.
President	Fernando López Miras	PP	29 July 2019	Incumbent	
Vice President; Minister of Women, Equality, LGTBI, Families and Social Policy	Isabel Franco	Cs / Ind. (Note: Rebelled from Cs and expelled from the party in March 2021.)	1 August 2019	13 May 2022	
Minister of the Presidency and Finance	Javier Celdrán	PP	1 August 2019	3 April 2021	
Minister of Business, Industry and Spokesperson	Ana Martínez Vidal	Cs	1 August 2019	10 March 2021	
Minister of Tourism, Youth and Sports	María Cristina Sánchez	PP	1 August 2019	3 April 2021	
Minister of Education and Culture	Esperanza Moreno	PP	1 August 2019	3 April 2021	
Minister of Water, Agriculture, Livestock, Fisheries and Environment	Antonio Luengo	PP	1 August 2019	13 May 2022	
Minister of Transparency, Participation and Public Administration	Beatriz Ballesteros	Cs (Ind.)	1 August 2019	20 February 2021	
Minister of Development and Infrastructures	José Ramón Díez de Revenga	PP	1 August 2019	Incumbent	
Minister of Health	Manuel Villegas	PP (Ind.)	1 August 2019	23 January 2021	
Minister of Employment, Research and Universities	Miguel Motas	Cs (Ind.) (Note: Joined Cs in December 2019.)	1 August 2019	13 March 2021	
=== Changes January 2021 ===
Portfolio	Name	Party	Took office	Left office	Ref.
Minister of Health	Juan José Pedreño	PP (Ind.)	23 January 2021	Incumbent	
=== Changes February 2021 ===
Portfolio	Name	Party	Took office	Left office	Ref.
Minister of Transparency, Participation and Public Administration	José Gabriel Sánchez Torregrosa	Cs	23 February 2021	10 March 2021	
=== Changes March 2021 ===
Portfolio	Name	Party	Took office	Left office	Ref.
Minister of Business, Industry and Spokesperson	Javier Celdrán took on the office's attributions from 10 to 13 March 2021.				
Minister of Business, Industry and Spokesperson	María del Valle Miguélez	Cs / Ind.	13 March 2021	9 April 2021	
Minister of Transparency, Participation and Public Administration	Isabel Franco took on the office's attributions from 10 to 13 March 2021.				
Minister of Transparency, Participation and Public Administration	Antonio Sánchez Lorente	Cs / Ind.	13 March 2021	18 November 2021	
Minister of Employment, Research and Universities	Francisco Álvarez García	Cs / Ind.	13 March 2021	8 April 2021	
=== Changes April 2021 ===
Portfolio	Name	Party	Took office	Left office	Ref.
Minister of the Presidency, Tourism and Sports	Marcos Ortuño	PP	3 April 2021	8 February 2022	
Minister of Economy, Finance and Digital Administration	Javier Celdrán	PP	3 April 2021	Incumbent	
Minister of Business, Employment, Universities and Spokesperson (Note: On 9 April 2021, the Ministry of Employment, Research and Universities was disestablished and its competences transferred to the newly-established Business, Employment and Universities department.)	María del Valle Miguélez	Independent	9 April 2021	Incumbent	
Minister of Education and Culture	María Isabel Campuzano	Independent	3 April 2021	8 February 2022	
~~Minister of Employment, Research and Universities~~	María del Valle Miguélez took on the office's attributions from 8 to 9 April 2021.				
~~Minister of Employment, Research and Universities~~	Disestablished on 9 April 2021.				
=== Changes November 2021 ===
Portfolio	Name	Party	Took office	Left office	Ref.
Minister of Transparency, Security and Emergencies	Antonio Sánchez Lorente	Independent	18 November 2021	12 May 2022	
=== Changes February 2022 ===
Portfolio	Name	Party	Took office	Left office	Ref.
Minister of the Presidency, Tourism, Culture and Sports	Marcos Ortuño	PP	8 February 2022	Incumbent	
Minister of Education	María Isabel Campuzano	Independent	8 February 2022	Incumbent	
=== Changes May 2022 ===
Portfolio	Name	Party	Took office	Left office	Ref.
Vice President; Minister of Women, Equality, LGTBI, Families, Social Policy and Transparency	Isabel Franco	Independent	13 May 2022	Incumbent	
Minister of Water, Agriculture, Livestock, Fisheries, Environment and Emergencies	Antonio Luengo	PP	13 May 2022	Incumbent	
~~Minister of Transparency, Security and Emergencies~~ (Note: On 13 May 2022, the Minister of Transparency, Security and Emergencies was disestablished and its competences transferred to the Minister of Women, Equality, LGTBI, Families, Social Policy and Transparency and the Minister of Water, Agriculture, Livestock, Fisheries, Environment and Emergencies departments.)	Disestablished on 13 May 2022.				

== Notes ==
Preceded by López Miras I	Government of the Region of Murcia; 2019–present	Incumbent
