= 10th Regional Assembly of Murcia =

10th Assembly of Murcia
←	9th	11th	→
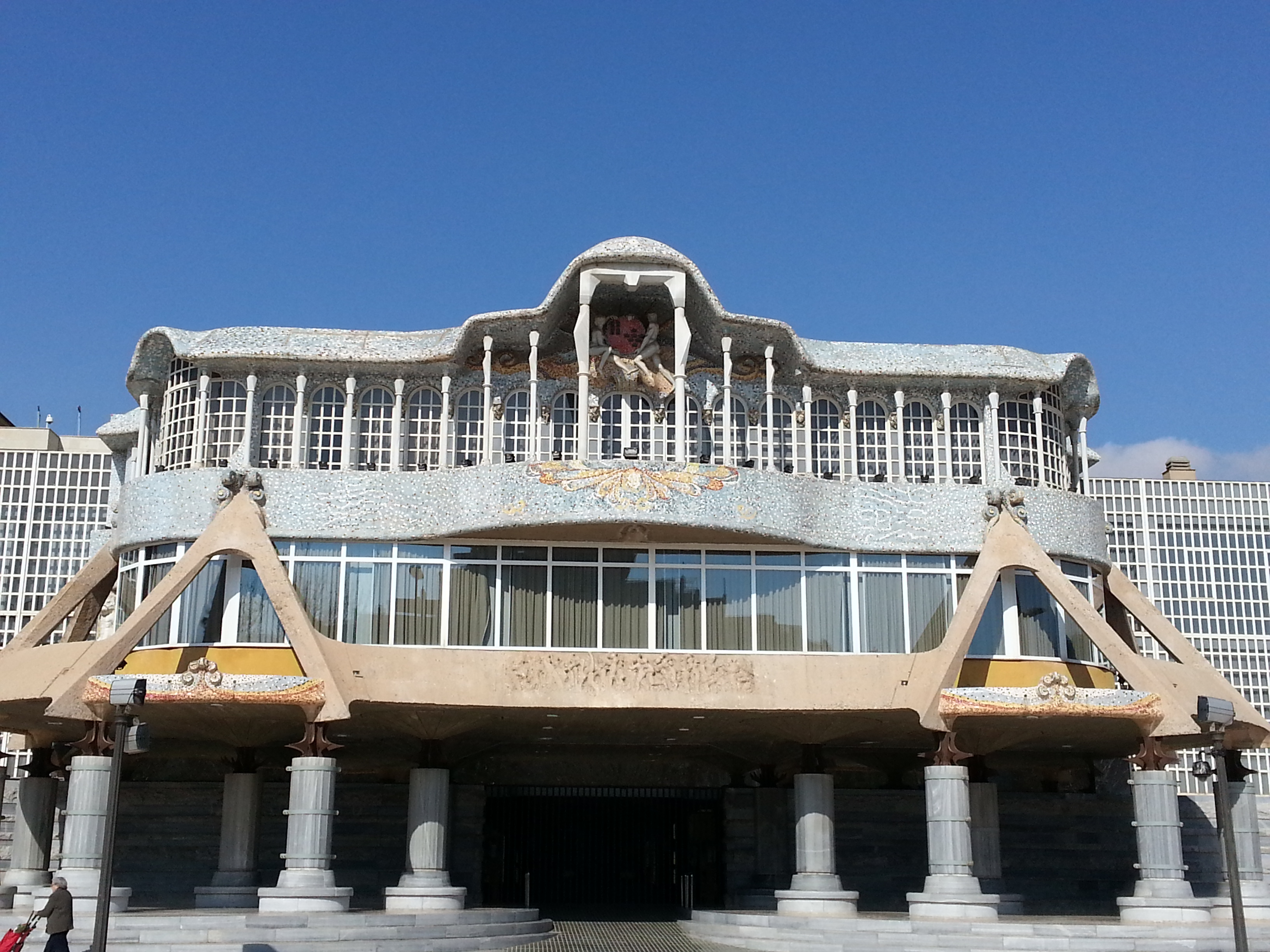

Overview
- Legislative body: Regional Assembly of Murcia
- Term: 10 June 2019 – 2023
- Election: 26 May 2019
- Government: López Miras II
- Website: asambleamurcia.es

Deputies
- Members: 45
- President: Alberto Castillo (Independent)
- First Vice-President: Miguel Ángel Miralles (PP)
- Second Vice-President: Gloria Alarcón (PSOE)
- First Secretary: Francisco José Carrera (Vox)
- Second Secretary: Emilio Ivars (PSOE, until 21 June 2020); Antonio José Espín (PSOE, since September 2020)

The 10th Assembly of Murcia was the meeting of the Regional Assembly of Murcia, with the membership determined by the results of the 2019 regional election held on 26 May 2019. The parliament met for the first time on 11 June 2019. According to the Statute of Autonomy of Murcia the maximum legislative term of assembly is 4 years from the preceding election.

== Election ==
The 10th Murcian regional elections was held on 26 May 2019. At the election the Spanish Socialist Workers' Party (PSOE) became the largest party in the Assembly but fell short of a majority.

Alliance	Votes	%	Seats	+/–
Spanish Socialist Workers' Party (PSOE)	212,600	32.47%	17	▲4
People's Party (PP)	211,849	32.35%	16	▼6
Citizens–Party of the Citizenry (Cs)	78,483	11.99%	6	▲2
Vox (Vox)	61,998	9.47%	4	▲4
We Can–Equo (Podemos-Equo)	36,486	5.57%	2	▼4
Others/blanks	53,380	8.14%	0	
Total	654,796	100.00%	45	Steady

== History ==
The new parliament met for the first time on 11 June 2019 and Alberto Castillo (Cs) was elected as President of the Assembly of Murcia with the support of PP and Cs.

President
Candidate		Votes	
Candidate		Round 1	Round 2
Alberto Castillo	Cs	22	22
Alfonso Martínez	PSOE	17	19
María Giménez	Podemos	2	Eliminated
Blank		4	4
Total		45	45

== Deaths, resignations and suspensions ==
The 10th Assembly of Murcia has seen the following deaths, resignations and suspensions:

- 28 September 2019 - Óscar Urralburu and María Giménez (Podemos) resigned in order to join Más País, a split from Podemos led by Iñigo Errejón. María Marín and Rafael Esteban (Podemos) replaced them on 18 and 23 October 2019, respectively.
- 25 October 2019 - Javier Celdrán, María Cristina Sánchez and Antonio Luengo (PP) resigned after being appointed ministers in the new regional government. Francisco José Espejo (PP) decided not to take his seat. Isabel María Sánchez, María Inmaculada Lardín and Juan Antonio Mata (PP) replaced them on 13 November 2019.
- 21 June 2020 - Emilio Ivars (PSOE) resigned. Later that year his party accused him of leaking information to the media without consent. María Hernández (PSOE) replaced him on 16 September 2020.
- 13 December 2021 - Diego Conesa (PSOE), leader of the socialist group, resigned. Early that year he had announced that he will not run for reelection as Secretary General of the PSRM. José Antonio Campos (PSOE) replaced him on 17 December 2021.
- 14 December 2022 - Rafael Esteban (Podemos) resigned to go back to his job. Helena Vidal (Greens Equo) replaced him on 15 February 2023.

== Changes in political affiliation ==
Once elected, members are organized in parliamentary groups (Spanish: grupos parlamentarios). The formation of such groups is up to the members, but it is common for members elected within the same list to form part of the same group. Members that do not belong to any group are place in the Mixed Group. Members may leave their group if they wish so. They can also be expelled from it. Their political affiliation is unlinked to the group they belong, meaning that changing or leaving a political party does not mean necessarily leaving or changing group.

The following list records members that changed party and/or group during this session.

Members that changed group and/or party
Name	Date	From		To		Reason
Name	Date	Party	Group	Party	Group	Reason
María Isabel Campuzano	23 Jun 2020	Vox	Vox	Ind.	Vox	Expelled from Vox.
María Isabel Campuzano	7 Oct 2022	Ind.	Vox	Ind.	Mixed	Left Vox group due to political disagreements, effectively dissolving the group.
Juan José Liarte	23 Jun 2020	Vox	Vox	Ind.	Vox	Expelled from Vox.
Juan José Liarte	7 Oct 2022	Ind.	Vox	Ind.	Mixed	Vox group dissolved after two of their members left.
Francisco José Carrera	23 Jun 2020	Vox	Vox	Ind.	Vox	Expelled from Vox.
Francisco José Carrera	7 Oct 2022	Ind.	Vox	Ind.	Mixed	Vox group dissolved after two of their members left.
María del Valle Miguelez	12 Mar 2021	Cs	Cs	Ind.	Cs	Expelled from Cs.
Isabel Franco	12 Mar 2021	Cs	Cs	Ind.	Cs	Expelled from Cs.
Francisco Álvarez	12 Mar 2021	Cs	Cs	Ind.	Cs	Expelled from Cs.
Alberto Castillo	1 Jun 2021	Cs	Cs	Ind.	Cs	Expelled from Cs.
Juan José Molina	21 Jun 2021	Cs	Cs	Cs	Mixed	Left Cs group as a majority of members of the group had been expelled from the party.
Ana Martínez	21 Jun 2021	Cs	Cs	Cs	Mixed	Left Cs group as a majority of members of the group had been expelled from the party.
Pascual Salvador	6 Oct 2022	Vox	Vox	Vox	Mixed	Left Vox group ordered by the national leadership of the party.

== Members ==
Name	No.	Party	Alliance	Group	Took office	Left office	Notes
Antonia Abenza	12	PSRM	PSOE	Socialists	11 June 2019		
Gloria Alarcón	2	PSRM	PSOE	Socialists	11 June 2019		
Francisco Álvarez	6	Cs	Cs	Citizens	11 June 2019		Expelled from Citizens in March 2021
Francisco Álvarez	N/A	Independent	Independent	Citizens	11 June 2019		Expelled from Citizens in March 2021
Antonio Calderón	11	PP	PP	People's	11 June 2019		
José Antonio Campos	19	PSRM	PSOE	Socialists	17 February 2021		
María Isabel Campuzano	3	Vox	Vox	Vox	11 June 2019		Expelled from Vox in June 2020 A court forced Vox to readmit her in January 2022
Jesús Cano	14	PP	PP	People's	11 June 2019		
Francisco José Carrera	4	Vox	Vox	Vox	11 June 2019		Expelled from Vox in June 2020 A court forced Vox to readmit him in January 2022
Rosalía Casado	10	PSRM	PSOE	Socialists	11 June 2019		
Alberto Castillo	4	Independent	Cs	Citizens	11 June 2019		Expelled from Citizens on 1 June 2021
Alberto Castillo	N/A	Independent	Independent	Citizens	11 June 2019		Expelled from Citizens on 1 June 2021
Javier Celdrán	6	PP	PP	People's	11 June 2019	25 October 2019	Replaced by Isabel María Sánchez.
Diego Conesa	1	PSRM	PSOE	Socialists	11 June 2019	13 December 2021	
Antonio José Espín	5	PSRM	PSOE	Socialists	11 June 2019		
Rafael Esteban	4	Podemos	Podemos–Equo	Mixed	23 October 2019	14 December 2022	Replaces María Giménez. Replaced by Helena Vidal.
María del Carmen Fernández	6	PSRM	PSOE	Socialists	11 June 2019		
María Isabel Franco	1	Cs	Cs	Citizens	11 June 2019		Expelled from Citizens in March 2021
María Isabel Franco	N/A	Independent	Independent	Citizens	11 June 2019		Expelled from Citizens in March 2021
María Giménez	2	Podemos	Podemos–Equo	Mixed	11 June 2019	28 September 2019	Replaced by Rafael Esteban
Miriam Guardiola	13	PP	PP	People's	11 June 2019		
María Hernández	18	PSRM	PSOE	Socialists	16 September 2020		Replaces Emilio Ivars
María Inmaculada Lardín	20	PP	PP	People's	13 November 2019		Replaces María Cristina Sánchez
Emilio Ivars	9	PSRM	PSOE	Socialists	13 November 2019	21 June 2020	Replaced by María Hernández
Juan José Liarte	2	Vox	Vox	Vox	11 June 2019		Expelled from Vox in June 2020 A court forced Vox to readmit him in January 2022
Pedro López	11	PSRM	PSOE	Socialists	11 June 2019		
Fernando López	1	PP	PP	People's	11 June 2019		
Virginia Lopo	14	PSRM	PSOE	Socialists	11 June 2019		
Antonio Luengo	9	PP	PP	People's	11 June 2019	25 October 2019	Replaced by Juan Antonio Mata
Francisco Lucas	3	PSRM	PSOE	Socialists	11 June 2019		
María Marín	3	Podemos	Podemos–Equo	Mixed	18 October 2019		Replaces Óscar Urralburu
Alfonso Martínez	7	PSRM	PSOE	Socialists	11 June 2019		
Consagración Martínez	16	PSRM	PSOE	Socialists	11 June 2019		
María Dolores Martínez	8	PSRM	PSOE	Socialists	11 June 2019		
Ana Martínez	3	Cs	Cs	Mixed	11 June 2019		Earlier member of the Citizens Group, left in 2021.
Victor Martínez-Carrasco	16	PP	PP	People's	11 June 2019		
Juan Antonio Mata	19	PP	PP	People's	13 November 2019		Replaces Antonio Luengo
María del Valle Miguélez	5	Cs	Cs	Citizens	11 June 2019		Expelled from Citizens in March 2021
María del Valle Miguélez	N/A	Independent	Independent	Citizens	11 June 2019		Expelled from Citizens in March 2021
Miguel Miralles	9	PP	PP	People's	11 June 2019		
Juan José Molina	2	Cs	Cs	Mixed	11 June 2019		Earlier member of the Citizens Group, left in 2021.
Fernando Moreno	17	PSRM	PSOE	Socialists	11 June 2019		
María del Carmen Pelegrín	7	PP	PP	People's	11 June 2019		
Jose Antonio Peñalver	13	PSRM	PSOE	Socialists	11 June 2019		
Sonia Ruiz	3	PP	PP	People's	11 June 2019		
María del Carmen Ruiz	12	PP	PP	People's	11 June 2019		
Pascual Salvador	1	Vox	Vox	Vox	11 June 2019		
María Magdalena Sánchez	4	PSRM	PSOE	Socialists	11 June 2019		
Isabel María Sánchez	17	PP	PP	People's	13 November 2019		Replaces Javier Celdrán
María Cristina Sánchez	2	PP	PP	People's	11 June 2019	25 October 2019	Replaced by María Inmaculada Lardín
Ramón Sánchez-Parra	8	PP	PP	People's	11 June 2019		
Joaquín Segado	5	PP	PP	People's	11 June 2019		
Manuel Sevilla	15	PSRM	PSOE	Socialists	11 June 2019		
Óscar Urralburu	1	Podemos	Podemos–Equo	Mixed	11 June 2019	28 September 2019	Replaced by María Marín
María Dolores Valcárcel	10	PP	PP	People's	11 June 2019		
Clara Valverde	15	PP	PP	People's	11 June 2019		
Helena Vidal	7	Equo	Podemos—Equo	People's	15 February 2023		Replaces Rafael Esteban
