= Council of Government of the Region of Murcia =

Executive branch of regional government in Spain

Overview
- Polity: Region of Murcia
- Leader: President of the Region of Murcia
- Headquarters: Palace of Saint Esteban, Murcia

The Council of Government of the Region of Murcia (Spanish: Consejo de Gobierno de la Región de Murcia) is the collegiate body charged with the executive and administrative functions of the autonomous community of the Region of Murcia, Spain.

It is headed by the president of the Region of Murcia, and additionally includes the appointed vice presidents and consejeros (cabinet ministers).

The cabinet ceases in office after the holding of legislative elections, remaining in a caretaking role until a new cabinet assumes office.

Its main headquarters are located at the Palace of Saint Esteban (Palacio de San Esteban), in Murcia.

== Cabinets ==
- Hernández Ros (1983–1984)
- Collado I (1984–1987)
- Collado II (1987–1991)
- Collado III (1991–1993)
- Leguina III (1993–1995)
- Valcárcel I (1995–1999)
- Valcárcel II (1999–2003)
- Valcárcel III (2003–2007)
- Valcárcel IV (2007–2011)
- Valcárcel V (2011–2014)
- Garre (2014–2015)
- Sánchez (2015–2017)
- López Miras I (2017–2019)
- López Miras II (2019–2023)
- López Miras III (2023–present)

== Current composition ==
| Portfolio | Name | Party | Took office |
|---|---|---|---|
| President | Fernando López Miras | PP | 29 July 2019 |
| Vice President; Cabinet Minister of Women, Equality, LGBTI, Families, Social Policy and Transparency | Isabel Franco Sánchez | Indep.^{(ex-Cs)} | 1 August 2019 |
| Cabinet Minister of the Presidency, Culture, Tourism and Sports | Marcos Ortuño | PP | 3 April 2021 |
| Cabinet Minister of Economy, Finance and Digital Administration | Javier Celdrán | PP | 3 April 2021 |
| Cabinet Minister of Business, Employment, Universities and Spokesperson | María del Valle Miguélez | Indep.^{(ex-Cs)} | 9 April 2021 |
| Cabinet Minister of Education | María Isabel Campuzano | Indep.^{(ex-Vox)} | 3 April 2021 |
| Cabinet Minister of Water, Agriculture, Livestock, Fisheries, Environment and Emergencies | Antonio Luengo | PP | 1 August 2019 |
| Cabinet Minister of Development and Infrastructures | José Ramón Díez de Revenga | PP | 1 August 2019 |
| Cabinet Minister of Health | Juan José Pedreño | Indep.^{(PP)} | 23 January 2021 |
