= José Ballesta =

Spanish politician (1958–2026)

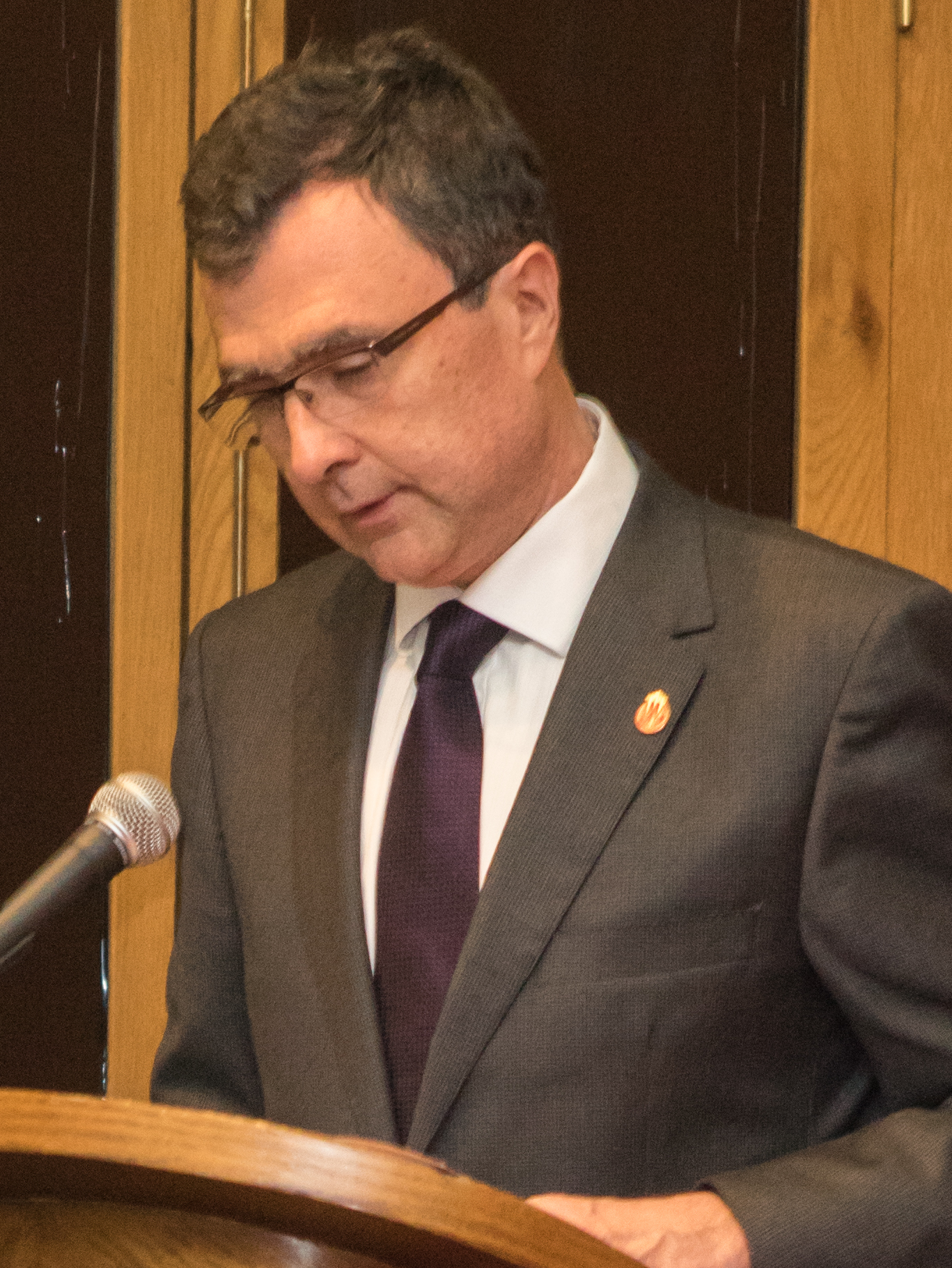
- Ballesta in 2015

Mayor of Murcia
- In office 17 June 2023 – 10 May 2026
- Preceded by: José Antonio Serrano Martínez
- Succeeded by: Rebeca Pérez
- In office 13 June 2015 – 25 March 2021
- Preceded by: Miguel Ángel Cámara
- Succeeded by: José Antonio Serrano Martínez

Personal details
- Born: José Francisco Ballesta Germán; 19 July 1958 Murcia, Spain
- Died: 10 May 2026 (aged 67)
- Party: PP

José Francisco Ballesta Germán (Spanish pronunciation: [xoˈse fɾanˈθisko βaˈʎesta xeɾˈman]; 19 July 1958 – 10 May 2026) was a Spanish medical professor and politician who served as the mayor of Murcia between 2015 and 2021, and again between 2023 and his death in 2026. He was a member of the People's Party. Ballesta previously served as a minister in the Government of the Region of Murcia between 2007 and 2014. He was also a full professor at the University of Murcia and served as the university's president from 1998 to 2006.

== Early life ==
Ballesta was born in Murcia on 19 July 1958. He earned bachelor's (1981) and master's (1983) degrees in medicine and surgery from the University of Murcia. He then did a post-doctorate with the Royal Postgraduate Medical School at Hammersmith Hospital in London.

== Career ==
=== Academic career ===
In 1986 and 1992 respectively, Ballesta became an associate and full professor at his alma mater. He was the director of the Department of Molecular Biology from 1987 to 1989, and served in other internal posts before two terms as president of the university from 1998 to 2006. In June 2002, King Juan Carlos I awarded Ballesta the Grand Cross of Aeronautical Merit.

=== Regional minister ===
Ballesta was elected to the Regional Assembly of Murcia in the May 2007 elections, but resigned his seat on 6 July. He remained in the regional government as the minister in charge of public works, housing and transport. In this role, he disputed with the national government, which wished to introduce high-speed rail to Murcia but while sharing existing tracks, thus reducing its speed. After the 2011 elections, Ballesta stayed in Ramón Luis Valcárcel's government as Minister of Universities, Business and Research. For the 2013 budget, he pledged to prioritise staff and research over facilities. His role ended when the regional president resigned in April 2014.

=== Mayor of Murcia ===
With Valcárcel's endorsement as regional leader of the People's Party (PP), Ballesta was named as the party's candidate for mayor of Murcia in March 2015. He was invested as mayor in June, by simple majority with 12 of 27 councillors voting in favour of him, after the five from Citizens (Cs) abstained. In his first term, Ballesta oversaw pedestrianisation of the Alfonso X el Sabio street, conservation of the Segura river and installation of green areas. The opposition in the council called him the "mayor of photos" for his many public appearances, and he suffered bad publicity in 2018 when one of his councillors, Roque Ortiz, was recorded insinuating that the party was giving municipal contracts to allies.

Ballesta gained a second term in 2019, when his ten councillors formed a coalition with the four from Cs. In this term, he worked on the preservation of the city's Moorish ruins and its former prison, while disputes between the two government parties led to mutual legal threats. Relations between the two parties of the local government became worse during the COVID-19 pandemic. In March 2021, Cs withdrew their support of Ballesta, and joined the Spanish Socialist Workers' Party (PSOE) in a vote of no confidence, which passed with 15 votes in favour and 14 against replacing him with the PSOE's José Antonio Serrano Martínez. He then returned to his university department.

In December 2022, having never resigned his seat on the council, Ballesta was named by President of the Region of Murcia, Fernando López Miras, as the PP candidate for mayor of Murcia in the May 2023 elections. He achieved an absolute majority of 15 out of 29 seats. On 1 October 2023, thirteen people died in a nightclub fire, and Ballesta promised an investigation "no matter who falls [as a result]". By the time of his death in 2026, the court case was still ongoing, and the council's inquiry was inconclusive. Ballesta also oversaw festivities for the 1,200th anniversary of Murcia, in 2025. He regularly organised large events for Christmas, and in 2025 the municipal Christmas tree at the Plaza Circular was lit by Richard Gere and children with cancer whom the American actor was visiting.

== Personal life and death ==
Ballesta was a Catholic who attended Mass daily at the Cathedral of Murcia. He was married to Pilar Viñas, a chemistry professor at the University of Murcia, and had two sons and two daughters. One son, Juan, was a professional basketball player for UCAM Murcia CB.

Ballesta was diagnosed with cancer in 2024, and died of it on 10 May 2026, at the age of 67. The city council in Murcia announced three days of mourning. His deputy Rebeca Pérez, the first woman mayor of Murcia, was put in temporary charge prior to being elected as his successor. His funeral was held on 12 May at the cathedral.
