= Isabel Franco =

Isabel Franco may refer to:

- Isabel Franco Sánchez, Spanish journalist and politician
- Isabel Franco Carmona, Spanish Podemos politician
