= First government of Fernando López Miras =

1st government of Fernando López Miras
- Government of Murcia

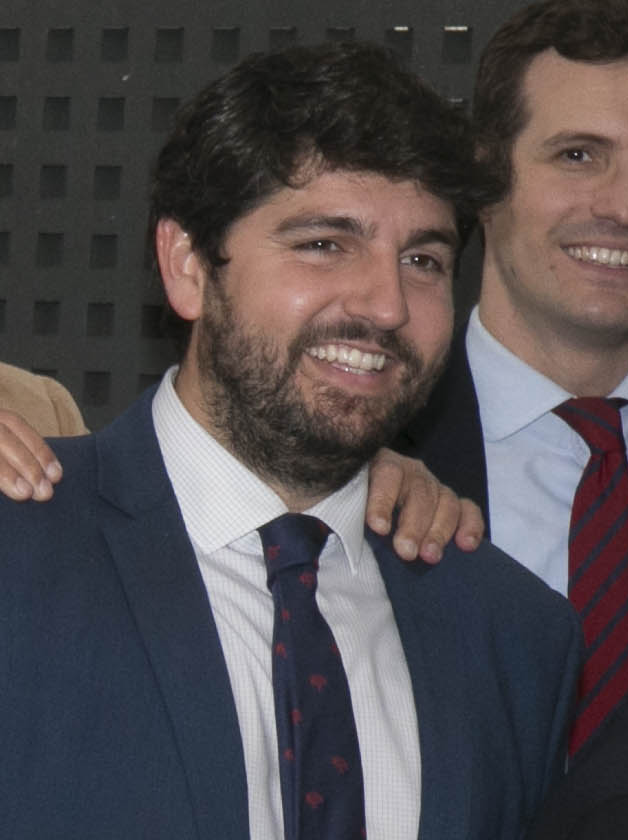
- Date formed: 5 May 2017
- Date dissolved: 1 August 2019

People and organisations
- Head of state: Felipe VI
- Head of government: Fernando López Miras
- No. of ministers: 11
- Ministers removed: 3
- Total no. of members: 14
- Member party: People's Party
- Status in legislature: Minority government 22 / 45 (49%)
- Opposition party: Socialist Party
- Opposition leader: Alfonso Martínez

History
- Outgoing election: 26 May 2019
- Legislature term: 9th Regional Assembly (2015–19)
- Predecessor: Sánchez
- Successor: López Miras II

The first López Miras government was a regional government of Murcia led by President Fernando López Miras. It was formed in May 2017 after the resignation of López Miras's predecessor Pedro Antonio Sánchez and ended in August 2019 following the regional election.

== Government ==
Name	Portrait	Party	Office	Took office	Left office	^{Refs.}
Fernando López Miras		People's Party of the Region of Murcia	President	2 May 2017	29 July 2019	
Noelia Arroyo		People's Party of the Region of Murcia	Minister of Transparency and Participation	5 May 2017	1 August 2019	
Noelia Arroyo		People's Party of the Region of Murcia	Government Spokesperson	5 May 2017	1 August 2019	
Andrés Carrillo		People's Party of the Region of Murcia	Minister of Finance and Public Administration	5 May 2017	20 April 2018	
Javier Celdrán		People's Party of the Region of Murcia	Minister of Tourism, Culture and Environment	5 May 2017	20 April 2018	
Javier Celdrán		People's Party of the Region of Murcia	Minister of Employment, Universities, Business and Environment	20 April 2018	1 August 2019	
Miguel Ángel del Amor		People's Party of the Region of Murcia	Minister of Water, Agriculture, Livestock and Fishing	20 April 2018	1 August 2019	
Fernando de la Cierva		People's Party of the Region of Murcia	Minister of Finance	20 April 2018	1 August 2019	
Miriam Guardiola		People's Party of the Region of Murcia	Minister of Tourism and Culture	20 April 2018	1 August 2019	
Juan Hernández		People's Party of the Region of Murcia	Minister of Employment, Universities and Business	5 May 2017	20 April 2018	
Francisco Jódar		People's Party of the Region of Murcia	Minister of Water, Agriculture, Livestock and Fishing	5 May 2017	20 April 2018	
Adela Martínez-Cachá		People's Party of the Region of Murcia	Minister of Education, Youth and Sports	5 May 2017	1 August 2019	
Pedro Rivera		People's Party of the Region of Murcia	Minister of the Presidency and Development	5 May 2017	20 April 2018	
Pedro Rivera		People's Party of the Region of Murcia	Minister of the Presidency	20 April 2018	1 August 2019	
Violante Tomás		People's Party of the Region of Murcia	Minister of Family and Equal Opportunities	5 May 2017	1 August 2019	
Patricio Valverde		People's Party of the Region of Murcia	Minister of Development and Infrastructure	20 April 2018	1 August 2019	
Manuel Villegas		People's Party of the Region of Murcia	Minister of Health	5 May 2017	1 August 2019	
