= Rebeca Pérez =

Spanish politician (born 1980)

Rebeca Pérez López (born 1980) is a Spanish politician of the People's Party (PP). She entered the city council in Murcia in 2015, was appointed deputy mayor in 2023, and was elected mayor in 2026, becoming the first woman to lead the city council.

== Biography ==
Born in Murcia, Pérez holds degrees in business studies and in optics, as well as a master's degree in applied political analysis. Her father Ángel Pérez Martínez, known as "El Puma", has been mayor since 1995 of El Esparragal, a village in Murcia's municipality. She was 20th on the People's Party (PP) list in Murcia led by Miguel Ángel Cámara in the 2011 local elections, missing election by 200 votes. In March 2015, with two months left of the term, Adela Martínez-Cachá left a position in the Council of Government of the Region of Murcia, and Pérez took her seat on the council.

In the 2015 local elections, she was 10th on the PP list led by José Ballesta. Ballesta became mayor and Pérez was put in charge of infrastructure and youth. In 2019, she rose to second behind him on the electoral list. Ballesta put her in charge of sustainable mobility and youth, as well as being the municipal spokesperson; when he was removed from office in 2021, she continued as spokesperson of the PP group in the council.

In 2023, Ballesta won an absolute majority and created for Pérez the role of deputy mayor. She was also in charge of growth and heritage, as well as being spokesperson. Ballesta died of cancer on 10 May 2026, and she was acting mayor until the vote for his successor on 22 May, in which she received the votes of the 15 councillors from the PP, while the 14 opposition members from the Spanish Socialist Workers' Party (PSOE) and Vox abstained. She became the first woman to be mayor of Murcia.
