= Alberto Castillo =

Alberto Castillo may refer to:

- Alberto Castillo Urbistondo (died 1905), Chilean lawyer and politician
- Alberto Castillo (performer) (1914–2002), Argentine singer and actor
- Alberto Castillo Baños (born 1955), Spanish politician
- Alberto Castillo (catcher) (born 1970), Dominican baseball catcher
- Alberto Castillo (pitcher) (born 1975), Cuban baseball pitcher
