= Diego Conesa =

Spanish politician (born 1973)

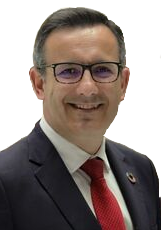

Diego Conesa Alcaraz (born 19 June 1973) is a Spanish former politician. As a member of the Spanish Socialist Workers' Party (PSOE), he was a councillor in Alhama de Murcia from 2011 to 2018, and its mayor from 2015. From 2017 to 2021, he was secretary general of the PSOE in Murcia. He was the government delegate to the Region of Murcia from 2018 to 2019, and a member of the Regional Assembly of Murcia from 2019 to 2021.

== Biography ==
=== Early life and career ===
Born in Fuente Álamo de Murcia, Conesa moved to Alhama de Murcia at age 19 while studying law. He joined the Unified Socialist Youth (JSU) in 1996 and worked for 16 years as a self-employed consultant.

In 2011, Conesa was elected to the council in Alhama. Four years later he was elected mayor, the first from the Spanish Socialist Workers' Party (PSOE) since 1999. In October 2017, he ran for secretary general of the Socialist Party of the Region of Murcia. In the first round, he won by 12 votes over Congress of Deputies member María González Veracruz, but in the run-off, he defeated her by 220 votes, due to receiving support from those who had previously backed eliminated candidate Francisco Lucas Ayala.

Conesa resigned his offices as councillor and mayor in June 2018, upon being named government delegate to the Region of Murcia. He was named by Pedro Sánchez, who had become prime minister of Spain following a motion of no confidence. During his time in office, he modified the conditions of AVE high-speed rail being introduced to the region, so that it would arrive after local works had concluded.

=== Assembly of the Region of Murcia ===
In April 2019, he resigned due to the campaign for the 2019 Murcian regional election, in which he was the PSOE candidate for President of the Region of Murcia. His party increased by four seats to 17, one more than the People's Party (PP); it was the first time since 1991 that the PSOE had won the most seats in the region. To reach a majority, the PSOE needed the support of the six deputies from Citizens (Cs). Incumbent Fernando López Miras of the PP remained in power after the second investiture session, having been supported by Cs and Vox. Conesa condemned the agreement with Vox, accusing them of wanting to cut public spending and infringe on human rights, and condemned Cs leader Isabel Franco for her choice of government partner after campaigning against the PP and Vox.

In March 2021, Conesa backed a motion of no confidence to remove López Miras as president and replace him with Cs deputy Ana Martínez Vidal. The motion was supported by PSOE, Cs and Podemos, and opposed by the PP, Vox and six independents formerly of Cs or Vox.

=== Resignation and retirement ===
In September 2021, Conesa announced he would not run for re-election as secretary general of the PSOE in the region. He officially left his seat in the Regional Assembly of Murcia on 13 December. Conesa announced his retirement from politics in November 2025.
