= List of presidents of the Regional Assembly of Murcia =

President of the Regional Assembly of Murcia
- Presidente de la Asamblea Regional de Murcia
- Flag of the Region of Murcia
- Incumbent; Alberto Castillo since 11 June 2019
- Member of: Regional Assembly of Murcia
- Formation: 15 July 1982
- First holder: Carlos Collado

This article lists the presidents of the Regional Assembly of Murcia, the regional legislature of Murcia.

== Presidents ==
^{No.}	Name	Portrait	Party	Took office	Left office	^{Legs.}	^{Refs.}
1	Carlos Collado		Socialist Party of the Region of Murcia	15 July 1982	1983	Prov.	
1	Carlos Collado		Socialist Party of the Region of Murcia	28 May 1983	26 March 1984	1st	
2	Manuel Tera		Socialist Party of the Region of Murcia	6 April 1984	1987	1st	
3	Miguel Navarro		Socialist Party of the Region of Murcia	1987	1991	2nd	
3	Miguel Navarro		Socialist Party of the Region of Murcia	1991	26 November 1993	3rd	
4	José Plana		Socialist Party of the Region of Murcia	26 November 1993	1995	3rd	
5	Francisco Celdrán		People's Party of the Region of Murcia	1995	1999	4th	
5	Francisco Celdrán		People's Party of the Region of Murcia	30 June 1999	2003	5th	
5	Francisco Celdrán		People's Party of the Region of Murcia	19 June 2003	2007	6th	
5	Francisco Celdrán		People's Party of the Region of Murcia	18 June 2007	2011	7th	
5	Francisco Celdrán		People's Party of the Region of Murcia	2011	2015	8th	
6	Rosa Peñalver		Socialist Party of the Region of Murcia	15 June 2015	2019	9th	
7	Alberto Castillo		Citizens	11 June 2019		10th	
