= Fonda Milagros nightclub fire =

Fatal blaze in Spain

- Date: 1 October 2023
- Location: Fonda Milagros nightclub, Murcia, Spain; 37°59′38″N 01°06′57″W
- Type: Fire
- Deaths: 13
- Injuries: 24
- Missing: 2

On 1 October 2023, a fire broke out in a building hosting at least three nightclubs in Murcia, Spain, killing 13 people and injuring 24. It was the deadliest nightclub fire in Spain since 1990.

== Background ==
The building hosting the affected nightclubs was located in the Atalayas area of Murcia. The first of these nightclubs to be established was the Teatre, which opened in 2008. The discotheque was evacuated in June 2009 after a short-circuit caused its façade to catch fire.

In 2019, the owners requested city officials to approve splitting the nightclub into two separate venues, creating the Fonda Milagros nightclub, also known as La Fonda next door. Both nightclubs were ordered closed in 2022 after authorities determined that they needed separate licenses and lacked other requirements such as an approved crowd capacity limit, but both continued to operate. The two clubs were separated by walls made only of plasterboard.

== Events ==
The fire broke out in the early morning of 1 October 2023 around 06:00 CEST. It began on the first floor of the Fonda Milagros club, and then spread to the adjoining Teatre and Golden nightclubs. Authorities attributed the rapid spread of the fire to the air conditioning system. Police stated the Fonda Milagros collapsed after suffering "substantial structural damage" from the fire.

More than 40 firefighters and 12 emergency vehicles responded to the scene, with firefighters arriving at 07:00 and extinguishing the fire by 08:00, after which they discovered the first fatalities inside the building.

== Casualties ==
Thirteen people were killed in the fire, all of whom were found at the Fonda Milagros club, while 24 others were injured. At least four of them were hospitalized for smoke inhalation. Many of the victims were attending a birthday party at the club. Only three victims were identified through fingerprints, with the remaining fatalities were identified through DNA testing. The dead included nationals of Colombia, Ecuador, and Nicaragua.

== Aftermath ==
The Palacio de Deportes de Murcia was converted into a counselling centre for those affected and an information area for relatives of the victims.

== Reactions ==
Mayor José Ballesta declared three days of mourning in the city. King Felipe VI and Prime Minister Pedro Sánchez expressed their condolences to the victims of the disaster and their families. The local hotel-restaurant association Hoytu announced the city's bars and restaurants would remain closed for the rest of the day in a sign of respect to the victims.

A minute of silence was observed in Murcia at noon on 2 October. A judicial investigation into the cause of the disaster was opened on 3 October.

== See also ==
- List of nightclub fires
- List of building or structure fires
