= Isabel Franco Carmona =

Spanish politician (born 1985)

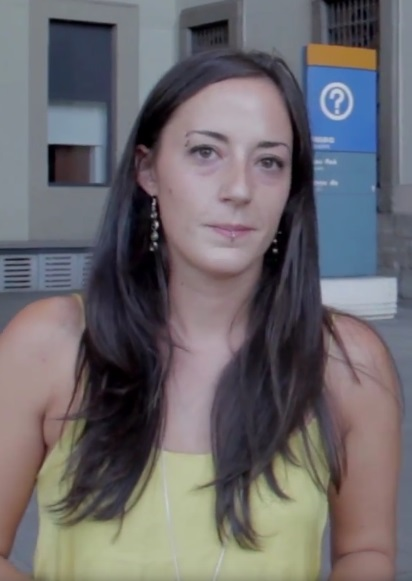

Isabel Franco Carmona (born 27 November 1985) is a Spanish Podemos politician. She was first elected to the Congress of Deputies in 2015, for Huelva and later for Seville.

== Biography ==
Born in Seville, Franco has a degree in Labour Sciences from the University of Seville and a master's degree in Advanced Labour and Employment Studies from the Complutense University of Madrid. As the expected candidate David Bravo was transferred to lead Podemos' list in Almería, Franco led the party's campaign in Huelva, where she was the youngest candidate; on the subject of not being a resident of the province, she said "all of us who put ourselves forward [in Podemos primaries] for Andalusia are Andalusians". She became the party's first congress member elected from the province, campaigning on the environmental issue of ending phosphogypsum extraction, and increased rail infrastructure.

For the April 2019 elections, Franco was second on the Podemos list in her home province, with the top two elected.

In February 2021, Franco made a speech in Congress in which she accused the "Hispanic Monarchy" of invasion and genocide in the Reconquista. The historical accuracy of the speech was disputed, and earned a response from the Junta of Andalusia's Cultural and Historic Heritage Advisor, Patricia del Pozo: "the history of Andalusia is a history of coexistence, rich from the passage of so many civilisations and the fruit of coexistence".
