= Isabel Franco Sánchez =

Spanish journalist and politician

Isabel Franco
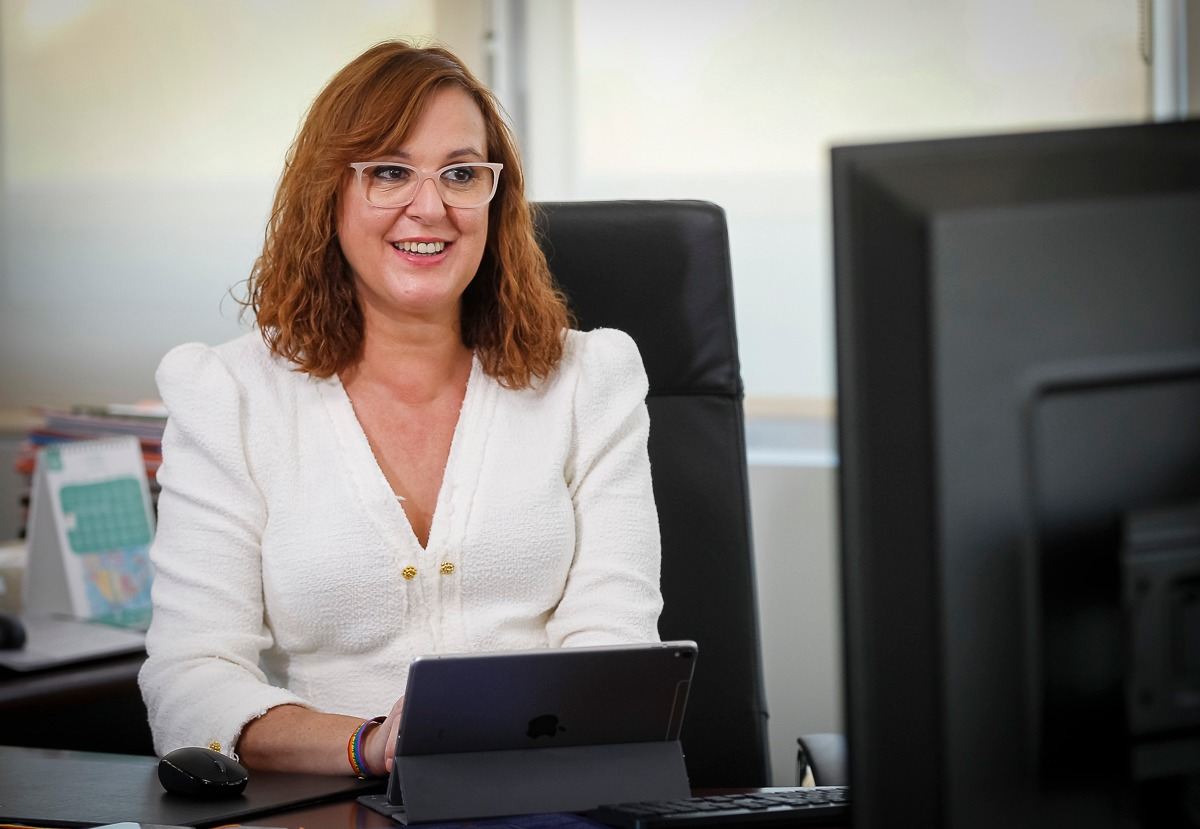

Vice President of the Region of Murcia
- Incumbent
- Assumed office 1 August 2019
- President: Fernando López Miras
- Preceded by: None

Minister of Women, Equality, LGTBI, Families, Social Policy and Transparency of the Region of Murcia
- Incumbent
- Assumed office 1 August 2019
- President: Fernando López Miras
- Preceded by: Adela Martínez-Cachá Martínez (Families and Equal Opportunities)

Personal details
- Born: María Isabel Franco Sánchez; 1970 (age 55–56) Murcia, Spain

María Isabel Franco Sánchez (born 1970) is a Spanish journalist and politician, previously of Citizens (Cs), who was that party's candidate for President of the Region of Murcia ahead of the 2019 Murcian regional election as well as Vice President of the Region of Murcia and Regional Minister of Women, Equality, LGTBI, Families and Social Policy since August 2019.

Franco was expelled from Ciudadanos on 13 March 2021 after she and two other deputies from the Ciudadanos group announced that they would join the PP-led regional government and vote against the motion of censure presented by their party on 10 March.
