= Alberto Castillo Baños =

Alberto Castillo Baños is a Spanish politician who served as the president of 10th Regional Assembly of Murcia from June 2019 until June 2023.
