= Antonio Luengo =

Spanish politician (born 1980)

Member of the Senate
- Incumbent
- Assumed office 23 July 2023
- Constituency: Murcia

Personal details
- Born: 16 July 1980 (age 45)
- Party: People's Party

Antonio Luengo Zapata (born 16 July 1980) is a Spanish politician serving as a member of the Senate since 2023. From 2022 to 2023, he served as minister of water, agriculture, livestock, fisheries, environment and emergencies of the Region of Murcia. From 2019 to 2022, he served as minister of water, agriculture, livestock, fisheries and environment.
