= 2019 Murcian regional election =

Election in the Spanish region of Murcia

- 26 May 2019

All 45 seats in the Regional Assembly of Murcia 23 seats needed for a majority
- Opinion polls
- Registered: 1,057,978 ▲3.0%
- Turnout: 659,437 (62.3%) ▼1.3 pp
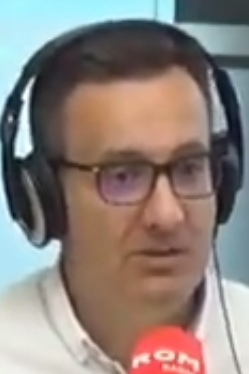

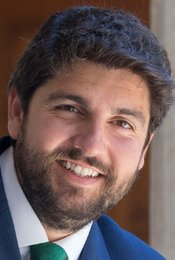

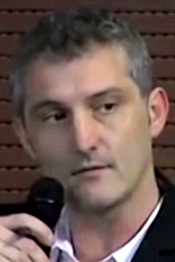
	First party	Second party	Third party
Leader	Diego Conesa	Fernando López Miras	Isabel Franco
Party	PSOE	PP	Cs
Leader since	30 September 2017	3 May 2017	9 March 2019
Last election	13 seats, 23.9%	22 seats, 37.4%	4 seats, 12.6%
Seats won	17	16	6
Seat change	▲4	▼6	▲2
Popular vote	212,600	211,849	78,483
Percentage	32.5%	32.4%	12.0%
Swing	▲8.6 pp	▼5.0 pp	▼0.6 pp
	Fourth party	Fifth party
Leader	Pascual Salvador	Óscar Urralburu
Party	Vox	Podemos–Equo
Leader since	21 April 2019	14 February 2015
Last election	0 seats, 0.8%	6 seats, 13.2%
Seats won	4	2
Seat change	▲4	▼4
Popular vote	61,998	36,486
Percentage	9.5%	5.6%
Swing	▲8.7 pp	▼7.6 pp
President before election
Fernando López Miras
PP
Elected President
Fernando López Miras
PP

A regional election was held in the Region of Murcia on 26 May 2019 to elect the 10th Regional Assembly of the autonomous community. All 45 seats in the Regional Assembly were up for election. It was held concurrently with regional elections in eleven other autonomous communities and local elections all across Spain, as well as the 2019 European Parliament election.

== Overview ==
=== Electoral system ===
The Regional Assembly of Murcia was the devolved, unicameral legislature of the autonomous community of Murcia, having legislative power in regional matters as defined by the Spanish Constitution and the Murcian Statute of Autonomy, as well as the ability to vote confidence in or withdraw it from a regional president. Voting for the Regional Assembly was on the basis of universal suffrage, which comprised all nationals over 18 years of age, registered in the Region of Murcia and in full enjoyment of their political rights. Additionally, Murcians abroad were required to apply for voting before being permitted to vote, a system known as "begged" or expat vote (Spanish: Voto rogado).

The 45 members of the Regional Assembly of Murcia were elected using the D'Hondt method and a closed list proportional representation, with an electoral threshold of three percent of valid votes—which included blank ballots—being applied regionally. (Note: A 2015 legal amendment had seen the five constituencies abolished and replaced by a single multi-member district comprising all the municipalities in the autonomous community. The electoral threshold was also lowered from five to three percent.)

=== Election date ===
The term of the Regional Assembly of Murcia expired four years after the date of its previous election. Elections to the Regional Assembly were fixed for the fourth Sunday of May every four years. The previous election was held on 24 May 2015, setting the election date for the Regional Assembly on 26 May 2019.

The president had the prerogative to dissolve the Regional Assembly of Murcia and call a snap election, provided that no motion of no confidence was in process, no nationwide election was due and some time requirements were met: namely, that dissolution did not occur either during the first legislative session or within the legislature's last year ahead of its scheduled expiry, nor before one year had elapsed since a previous dissolution under this procedure. In the event of an investiture process failing to elect a regional president within a two-month period from the first ballot, the Regional Assembly was to be automatically dissolved and a fresh election called. Any snap election held as a result of these circumstances would not alter the period to the next ordinary election, with elected lawmakers serving the remainder of its original four-year term.

The election to the Regional Assembly of Murcia was officially triggered on 2 April 2019 after the publication of the election decree in the Official Gazette of the Region of Murcia (BORM), scheduling for the chamber to convene on 11 June.

== Background ==
In the aftermath of the 2015 election, the People's Party (PP) and Citizens (Cs) signed a confidence and supply agreement which allowed Pedro Antonio Sánchez to be elected as new Murcian president. As part of the PP–Cs agreement, one of the newly elected Assembly's first initiatives was to increase the proportionality of the regional electoral system by scrapping the sub-provincial constituencies and lowering the required threshold from 5% to 3%.

A political crisis unveiled in the community after Pedro Antonio Sánchez was accused of several corruption offences on 20 February 2017. The scandal involved an ongoing judicial investigation on alleged irregularities in the process of awarding, construction and reception of an auditorium in Puerto Lumbreras, town from which Sánchez had been mayor between 2003 and 2013. While Sánchez had repeatedly assured he would resign right away if he was ever judicially charged for any crimes, he refused to do so after learning of his indictment despite Cs calls. Subsequently, Cs withdrew its parliamentary support, leaving the PP in minority, while threatening to support a censure motion on Sánchez promoted by the Spanish Socialist Workers' Party (PSOE) and Podemos. The PP accused Cs of breaking their agreement and of "playing with fire", with parties hinting at the possibility that a snap election could be eventually called by Sánchez in order to prevent his removal.

On 8 March, Cs gave Pedro Antonio Sánchez an ultimatum, demanding him to either tender his resignation or call a snap election before 27 March. Otherwise, Cs would support the PSOE censure motion to bring him down. On 3 April, the President of Murcia was accused by judge Eloy Velasco—from the National Audience—of participating in the case known as Trama Púnica (in Spanish), which led to his resignation as regional president on the following day and the withdrawal of the scheduled censure motion presented by the PSOE. During his farewell speech, Pedro Antonio Sánchez proposed Fernando López Miras as his successor.

== Parliamentary composition ==
The table below shows the composition of the parliamentary groups in the Regional Assembly at the time of dissolution.

Parliamentary composition in April 2019
Groups	Parties	Legislators	
Groups	Parties	Seats	Total
People's Parliamentary Group	PP	22	22
Socialist Parliamentary Group	PSOE	13	13
We Can Parliamentary Group	Podemos	6	6
Citizens Parliamentary Group	Cs	4	4

== Parties and candidates ==
The electoral law allowed for parties and federations registered in the interior ministry, coalitions and groupings of electors to present lists of candidates. Parties and federations intending to form a coalition ahead of an election were required to inform the relevant Electoral Commission within ten days of the election call, whereas groupings of electors needed to secure the signature of at least one percent of the electorate in the Region of Murcia, disallowing electors from signing for more than one list of candidates.

Below is a list of the main parties and electoral alliances which contested the election:

Candidacy	Parties and alliances	Leading candidate	Ideology	Previous result		Gov.	Ref.
Candidacy	Parties and alliances	Leading candidate	Ideology	Vote %	Seats	Gov.	Ref.
PP	List: People's Party (PP)	Fernando López Miras	Conservatism; Christian democracy	37.4%	22	Yes	
PSOE	List: Spanish Socialist Workers' Party (PSOE)	Diego Conesa	Social democracy	23.9%	13	No	
Podemos– Equo	List: We Can (Podemos); Equo (Equo)	Óscar Urralburu	Left-wing populism Direct democracy Democratic socialism	13.2%	6	No	
Cs	List: Citizens–Party of the Citizenry (Cs)	Isabel Franco	Liberalism	12.6%	4	No	
Vox	List: Vox (Vox)	Pascual Salvador	Right-wing populism Ultranationalism; National conservatism	0.8%	0	No	

== Opinion polls ==
The tables below list opinion polling results in reverse chronological order, showing the most recent first and using the dates when the survey fieldwork was done, as opposed to the date of publication. Where the fieldwork dates are unknown, the date of publication is given instead. The highest percentage figure in each polling survey is displayed with its background shaded in the leading party's colour. If a tie ensues, this is applied to the figures with the highest percentages. The "Lead" column on the right shows the percentage-point difference between the parties with the highest percentages in a poll.

=== Voting intention estimates ===
The table below lists weighted voting intention estimates. Refusals are generally excluded from the party vote percentages, while question wording and the treatment of "don't know" responses and those not intending to vote may vary between polling organisations. When available, seat projections determined by the polling organisations are displayed below (or in place of) the percentages in a smaller font; 23 seats were required for an absolute majority in the Regional Assembly of Murcia.

Color key:

Poll conducted after legal ban on opinion polls

Polling firm/Commissioner	Fieldwork date	Sample size	Turnout	PP	PSOE	Podemos	Cs	IU–V–RM	Vox	PACMA	Unidas Podemos	Somos Región	Lead
2019 regional election	26 May 2019	—N/a	62.3	32.4; 16	32.5; 17	5.6; 2	12.0; 6	2.0; 0	9.5; 4	0.9; 0	–	2.0; 0	0.1
ElectoPanel/Electomanía	22–23 May 2019	?	?	28.1; 14	27.7; 14	9.2; 4	17.5; 8	2.7; 0	9.9; 5	–	–	1.3; 0	0.4
ElectoPanel/Electomanía	21–22 May 2019	?	?	28.6; 14	27.7; 14	8.9; 4	16.8; 8	2.7; 0	9.7; 5	–	–	1.3; 0	0.9
ElectoPanel/Electomanía	20–21 May 2019	?	?	28.5; 14	27.6; 14	8.9; 4	16.8; 8	2.8; 0	10.1; 5	–	–	1.4; 0	0.9
ElectoPanel/Electomanía	19–20 May 2019	?	?	28.4; 14	27.4; 14	8.8; 4	17.0; 8	2.8; 0	9.9; 5	–	–	1.4; 0	1.0
NC Report/La Razón	19 May 2019	?	?	28.3; 14	30.1; 15	? 4	? 7	? 2	? 3	–	–	–	1.8
ElectoPanel/Electomanía	16–19 May 2019	?	?	27.0; 13	26.3; 13	8.2; 4	18.1; 9	2.9; 0	11.7; 6	–	–	2.0; 0	0.7
UCAM	18 May 2019	?	66.8	27.9; 14	29.4; 14	8.6; 4	14.3; 7	3.8; 1	9.9; 5	–	–	–	1.5
ElectoPanel/Electomanía	13–16 May 2019	?	?	26.0; 13	25.9; 13	7.9; 4	18.8; 9	3.5; 1	11.7; 5	–	–	2.7; 0	0.1
ElectoPanel/Electomanía	10–13 May 2019	?	?	25.9; 12	24.1; 12	6.9; 3	21.2; 10	4.0; 2	13.0; 6	–	–	2.0; 0	1.8
ElectoPanel/Electomanía	7–10 May 2019	?	?	25.0; 12	23.4; 11	7.7; 3	22.9; 11	3.9; 2	13.5; 6	–	–	2.1; 0	1.6
CEMOP	2–10 May 2019	1,084	69.3	28.5; 13/14	27.1; 13/14	7.8; 4	15.4; 8	2.2; 0	12.6; 6	2.1; 0	–	1.5; 0	1.4
ElectoPanel/Electomanía	4–7 May 2019	?	?	24.4; 12	23.9; 12	7.3; 3	23.3; 11	3.5; 1	13.7; 6	–	–	1.9; 0	0.5
ElectoPanel/Electomanía	29 Apr–4 May 2019	?	?	24.1; 12	24.2; 12	7.7; 3	23.8; 11	3.0; 1	13.8; 6	–	–	2.0; 0	0.1
April 2019 general election	28 Apr 2019	—N/a	73.5	23.4; 11	24.8; 11	(Note: Within Unidas Podemos.)	19.5; 9		18.6; 9	1.4; 0	10.4; 5	0.7; 0	1.4
CIS	21 Mar–23 Apr 2019	519	?	26.1; 12/14	31.1; 14/17	9.0; 4/5	15.3; 7/8	4.0; 1/2	9.9; 4/5	2.2; 0	–	–	5.0
ElectoPanel/Electomanía	31 Mar–7 Apr 2019	?	?	26.5; 13	22.8; 11	6.4; 3	17.9; 9	4.0; 2	14.9; 7	–	–	2.0; 0	3.7
ElectoPanel/Electomanía	24–31 Mar 2019	?	?	25.7; 12	23.1; 12	6.2; 3	18.6; 9	4.1; 2	15.0; 7	–	–	2.1; 0	2.6
CEMOP	18–30 Mar 2019	1,041	66.3	31.6; 15	28.1; 13/14	10.8; 5	14.4; 7	3.0; 0/1	8.4; 4	0.7; 0	–	1.1; 0	3.5
ElectoPanel/Electomanía	17–24 Mar 2019	?	?	25.6; 12	23.8; 12	6.0; 3	19.0; 9	4.0; 2	14.7; 7	–	–	–	1.8
ElectoPanel/Electomanía	10–17 Mar 2019	?	?	25.2; 12	22.9; 11	5.9; 3	18.4; 9	4.3; 2	17.6; 8	–	–	–	2.3
ElectoPanel/Electomanía	3–10 Mar 2019	?	?	24.8; 12	22.6; 11		19.5; 10		17.4; 8	–	9.8; 4	–	2.2
ElectoPanel/Electomanía	22 Feb–3 Mar 2019	?	?	24.8; 12	22.4; 11		19.8; 10		17.2; 8	–	9.8; 4	–	2.4
ElectoPanel/Electomanía	3–9 Feb 2019	591	?	25.5; 13	21.6; 10		21.3; 10		15.5; 7	–	10.2; 5	–	3.9
Celeste-Tel/IU	17 Oct–4 Nov 2018	800	62.0	26.9; 13	25.9; 13	9.6; 4	19.8; 10	6.0; 3	5.2; 2	–	–	2.3; 0	1.0
CEMOP	11–28 Oct 2018	815	69.6	30.8; 16	26.4; 13	10.1; 5	18.0; 9	2.8; 0	5.0; 2	2.2; 0	–	2.4; 0	4.4
CEMOP	2–23 May 2018	817	69.6	25.8; 13	18.9; 9	10.1; 5	31.3; 16	–	–	–	–	5.6; 2	5.5
SyM Consulting	7–9 Mar 2018	1,100	63.4	32.4; 15/16	26.0; 12/13	10.2; 4/5	18.8; 9	7.1; 2/3	–	–	–	–	6.4
PP	24 Mar 2017	?	?	? 19/20	? 13	? 6	? 4/5	? 2	–	–	–	–	?
Celeste-Tel/PSOE	16–22 Mar 2017	1,000	?	34.5; 16/17	26.1; 13/14	15.7; 7/8	15.5; 6/7	2.4; 0	–	–	–	–	8.4
NC Report/La Razón	27 Feb–1 Mar 2017	600	60.4	39.1; 20	22.9; 12	12.0; 6	12.9; 6	3.6; 1	–	–	–	–	16.2
2016 general election	26 Jun 2016	—N/a	69.6	46.7; 22	20.3; 9		15.7; 7		0.4; 0	1.2; 0	14.5; 7	–	26.4
2015 general election	20 Dec 2015	—N/a	71.1	40.4; 20	20.3; 10	15.2; 7	17.7; 8	3.1; 0	0.5; 0	0.9; 0	–	–	20.1
2015 regional election	24 May 2015	—N/a	63.6	37.4; 22	23.9; 13	13.2; 6	12.6; 4	4.8; 0	0.8; 0	0.7; 0	–	–	13.5

=== Voting preferences ===
The table below lists raw, unweighted voting preferences.

Polling firm/Commissioner	Fieldwork date	Sample size	PP	PSOE	Podemos	Cs	IU–V–RM	Vox	PACMA	Unidas Podemos	Somos Región	Question	X mark	Lead
2019 regional election	26 May 2019	—N/a	20.6	20.6	3.5	7.6	1.3	6.0	0.5	–	1.3	—N/a	35.9	0.0
CEMOP	2–10 May 2019	1,084	19.2	20.3	5.5	13.6	0.9	7.4	1.4	–	0.9	22.3	5.6	1.1
April 2019 general election	28 Apr 2019	—N/a	17.6	18.5		14.6		14.0	1.0	7.8	0.5	—N/a	24.3	0.9
CIS	21 Mar–23 Apr 2019	519	19.5	23.4	4.5	8.4	1.4	7.2	1.0	–	–	24.5	8.4	3.9
CEMOP	18–30 Mar 2019	1,041	21.9	20.1	8.1	12.0	2.0	5.7	1.2	–	0.9	22.1	2.6	1.8
CEMOP	11–28 Oct 2018	815	19.4	16.7	5.3	11.4	1.1	3.9	1.2	–	1.5	20.2	12.9	2.7
CEMOP	2–23 May 2018	817	16.2	10.3	6.1	22.6	–	–	–	–	2.3	23.5	8.7	6.4
2016 general election	26 Jun 2016	—N/a	33.1	14.4		11.1		0.3	0.8	10.2	–	—N/a	28.7	18.7
2015 general election	20 Dec 2015	—N/a	29.2	14.7	11.0	12.8	2.3	0.3	0.7	–	–	—N/a	27.0	14.5
2015 regional election	24 May 2015	—N/a	23.9	15.3	8.4	8.0	3.1	0.6	0.5	–	–	—N/a	34.8	8.6

=== Victory preferences ===
The table below lists opinion polling on the victory preferences for each party in the event of a regional election taking place.

Polling firm/Commissioner	Fieldwork date	Sample size	PP	PSOE	Podemos	Cs	IU–V–RM	Vox	Other/ None	Question	Lead
CEMOP	2–10 May 2019	1,084	25.7	28.0	5.3	16.8	0.4	7.3	3.3	13.3	2.3
CEMOP	18–30 Mar 2019	1,041	26.0	25.6	8.1	15.6	2.6	6.4	4.5	11.2	0.4

=== Victory likelihood ===
The table below lists opinion polling on the perceived likelihood of victory for each party in the event of a regional election taking place.

Polling firm/Commissioner	Fieldwork date	Sample size	PP	PSOE	Podemos	Cs	Vox	Other/ None	Question	Lead
CEMOP	2–10 May 2019	1,084	36.4	36.9	0.1	3.0	1.8	0.2	21.7	0.5
CEMOP	18–30 Mar 2019	1,041	70.2	12.2	1.0	2.4	2.4	0.4	11.5	58.0

== Results ==
← Summary of the 26 May 2019 Regional Assembly of Murcia election results →
Parties and alliances	Popular vote			Seats	
Parties and alliances	Votes	%	±pp	Total	+/−
Spanish Socialist Workers' Party (PSOE)	212,600	32.47	+8.52	17	+4
People's Party (PP)	211,849	32.35	−5.00	16	−6
Citizens–Party of the Citizenry (Cs)	78,483	11.99	−0.58	6	+2
Vox (Vox)	61,998	9.47	+8.62	4	+4
We Can–Equo (Podemos–Equo)	36,486	5.57	−7.65	2	−4
Municipalist Coalition MC–CCD–CIFA–PITP–UxA (MC–CCD)^{1}	14,605	2.23	−0.20	0	±0
We Are Region (Somos Región)	13,373	2.04	New	0	±0
Change the Region of Murcia (United Left–Greens+Anticapitalists) (CR)^{2}	13,252	2.02	−2.79	0	±0
Animalist Party Against Mistreatment of Animals (PACMA)	5,561	0.85	+0.12	0	±0
Communist Party of the Peoples of Spain (PCPE)	798	0.12	±0.00	0	±0
With You, We Are Democracy (Contigo)	641	0.10	New	0	±0
Seniors in Action (3e en acción)	554	0.08	New	0	±0
Cantonal Party (PCAN)	512	0.08	New	0	±0
Plural Democracy (DPL)	377	0.06	New	0	±0
Spanish Digital Democratic Union (UDDE)	228	0.03	New	0	±0
Blank ballots	3,479	0.53	−1.04		
Total	654,796			45	±0
Valid votes	654,796	99.30	+1.30		
Invalid votes	4,641	0.70	−1.30		
Votes cast / turnout	659,437	62.33	−1.24		
Abstentions	398,541	37.67	+1.24		
Registered voters	1,057,978				
Sources
Footnotes: ^{1} Municipalist Coalition MC–CCD–CIFA–PITP–UxA results are compared to the combined totals of Citizens' Movement of Cartagena and Citizens of Democratic Centre in the 2015 election.; ^{2} Change the Region of Murcia (United Left–Greens+Anticapitalists) results are compared to Winning the Region of Murcia: Plural Left totals in the 2015 election.

Popular vote
PSOE	32.47%
PP	32.35%
Cs	11.99%
Vox	9.47%
Podemos–Equo	5.57%
MC–CCD	2.23%
Somos Región	2.04%
CR	2.02%
Others	1.32%
Blank ballots	0.53%

Seats
PSOE	37.78%
PP	35.56%
Cs	13.33%
Vox	8.89%
Podemos–Equo	4.44%

== Aftermath ==
=== Government formation ===
Investiture; Fernando López Miras (PP)
Ballot →	2 July 2019	4 July 2019
Required majority →	23 out of 45	Simple
Yes: • PP (16) (15 on 2 Jul); • Cs (6)	21 / 45	22 / 45
No: • PSOE (17); • Vox (4); • Podemos–Equo (2)	23 / 45	23 / 45
Abstentions	0 / 45	0 / 45
Absentees: • PP (1) (on 2 Jul)	1 / 45	0 / 45

Investiture; Fernando López Miras (PP)
Ballot →	26 July 2019
Required majority →	23 out of 45
Yes: • PP (16); • Cs (6); • Vox (4)	26 / 45
No: • PSOE (16); • Podemos–Equo (2)	18 / 45
Abstentions	0 / 45
Absentees: • PSOE (1)	1 / 45

=== 2021 motion of no-confidence ===
Motion of no-confidence Ana Martínez Vidal (Cs)
Ballot →	18 March 2021
Required majority →	23 out of 45
Yes: • PSOE (17); • Cs (2); • Podemos (2)	21 / 45
No: • PP (16); • INDEP (6); • Vox (1)	23 / 45
Abstentions: • Cs (1)	1 / 45
Absentees	0 / 45
