= Third government of Fernando López Miras =

The Third government of Fernando López Miras was formed on 14 September 2023 following the 2023 Murcian regional election.

== Members ==
Members of the third government of Fernando López Miras
Role	Holder	Party
President	Fernando Lopez Miras	PP
Vice-president Advisor for the Interior, Emergencies and Regional Planning	José Ángel Antelo	Vox
Advisor to the Presidency and External Action Spokesperson	Marcos Ortuño Soto	PP
Advisor to the Economy, Finance and Business	Luis Alberto Marín González	PP
Advisor for Water, Agriculture, Livestock and Fisheries	Sara Rubira Martínez	Independent
Advisor for Social Policy, Families and Equality	Maria Concepcion Ruiz Caballero	PP
Advisor to Education, Vocational Training and Employment	Víctor Javier Marín Navarro	Independent
Health Advisor	Juan José Pedreño Planes	Independent
Equipment and Infrastructure Advisor	Jose Manuel Pancorbo	Vox
Advisor to the Environment, the Mar Menor, Higher Education and Research	Juan María Vázquez Rojas	PP
Advisor for Culture, Tourism, Youth and Sports	Carmen Maria Conesa Nieto	PP
