= President of the Region of Murcia =

- Flag of the Region of Murcia

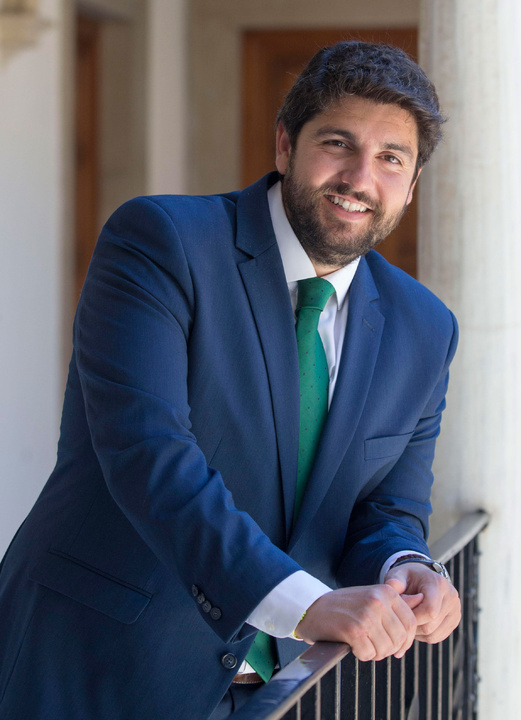
- Incumbent; Fernando López Miras since April 29, 2017
- Nominator: Regional Assembly of Murcia
- Appointer: The Monarch; countersigned by the Prime Minister
- Inaugural holder: Andrés Hernández Ros
- Formation: 1982

The President of the Region of Murcia, (Spanish: Presidente de la Región de Murcia) is the head of government of the Spanish autonomous community of the Region of Murcia. Since 2014, no person who has been elected to two terms may be elected to a third.

== List of Presidents of the Region of Murcia ==
=== Pre-autonomous government (1978–1983) ===
The Regional Council of Murcia (Consejo Regional de Murcia) was the governing body of the Region of Murcia from 1978 until the creation of the autonomous community in 1982. The two Presidents of the Regional Council were Antonio Pérez Crespo and Andrés Hernández Ros.

Name	Term of office			Political Party
Name	Took office	Left office	Days	Political Party
Antonio Pérez Crespo (1929–2012)	10 November 1978	5 May 1979	176	Union of the Democratic Centre
Antonio Pérez Crespo (1929–2012)	President of the Regional Council.			Union of the Democratic Centre
Andrés Hernández Ros (1948–2016)	5 May 1979	22 July 1982	1174	Socialist Party of the Region of Murcia
Andrés Hernández Ros (1948–2016)	Pre-autonomous Regional Council abolished in 1982.			Socialist Party of the Region of Murcia

=== Autonomous government (1982–present) ===
The office of the President of the Region of Murcia was created in 1982 upon the creation of the autonomous community.

Governments:

- PSOE
- PP
- Mixed coalition

Portrait	Name (Birth–Death)	Term of office			Party	Government Composition	Election	Monarch (Reign)	Ref.
Portrait	Name (Birth–Death)	Took office	Left office	Duration	Party	Government Composition	Election	Monarch (Reign)	Ref.
	Andrés Hernández Ros (1948–2016)	30 July 1982	16 June 1983	1 year and 245 days	PSOE	Hernández Ros I PSOE	N/A	King; Juan Carlos I (1975–2014)	
	Andrés Hernández Ros (1948–2016)	16 June 1983	31 March 1984	1 year and 245 days	PSOE	Hernández Ros II; PSOE	1983	King; Juan Carlos I (1975–2014)	
	Carlos Collado (born 1938)	31 March 1984	23 July 1987	9 years and 33 days	PSOE	Collado I PSOE	1983	King; Juan Carlos I (1975–2014)	
	Carlos Collado (born 1938)	23 July 1987	24 June 1991	9 years and 33 days	PSOE	Collado II; PSOE	1987	King; Juan Carlos I (1975–2014)	
	Carlos Collado (born 1938)	24 June 1991	3 May 1993	9 years and 33 days	PSOE	Collado III; PSOE	1991	King; Juan Carlos I (1975–2014)	
	María Antonia Martínez (born 1953)	3 May 1993	4 July 1995	2 years and 62 days	PSOE	Martínez; PSOE	1991	King; Juan Carlos I (1975–2014)	
	Ramón Luis Valcárcel (born 1954)	4 July 1995	12 July 1999	18 years and 279 days	PP	Valcárcel I PP	1995	King; Juan Carlos I (1975–2014)	
	Ramón Luis Valcárcel (born 1954)	12 July 1999	21 November 2003	18 years and 279 days	PP	Valcárcel II; PP	1999	King; Juan Carlos I (1975–2014)	
	Ramón Luis Valcárcel (born 1954)	21 November 2003	20 June 2007	18 years and 279 days	PP	Valcárcel III; PP	2003	King; Juan Carlos I (1975–2014)	
	Ramón Luis Valcárcel (born 1954)	16 June 2007	17 September 2011 (resigned)	18 years and 279 days	PP	Valcárcel IV; PP	2007	King; Juan Carlos I (1975–2014)	
	Ramón Luis Valcárcel (born 1954)	16 June 2011	9 April 2014 (resigned)	18 years and 279 days	PP	Valcárcel V PP	2011	King; Juan Carlos I (1975–2014)	
	Alberto Garre (born 1952)	9 April 2014	3 July 2015	1 year and 85 days	PP	Garre; PP	2011	King; Juan Carlos I (1975–2014)	
	Alberto Garre (born 1952)	9 April 2014	3 July 2015	1 year and 85 days	PP	Garre; PP	2011	King; Felipe VI (2014–present)	
	Pedro Antonio Sánchez (born 1976)	3 July 2015	4 April 2017 (resigned)	1 year and 303 days	PP	Sánchez; PP	2015	King; Felipe VI (2014–present)	
During this interval, Minister of the Presidency María Dolores Pagán served as acting officeholder.						Sánchez; PP	2015	King; Felipe VI (2014–present)	
	Fernando López Miras (born 1983)	2 May 2017	29 July 2019	9 years and 176 days	PP	López Miras I PP	2015	King; Felipe VI (2014–present)	
	Fernando López Miras (born 1983)	29 July 2019	8 September 2023	9 years and 176 days	PP	López Miras II; PP–Cs until Mar 2021; PP from Mar 2021	2019	King; Felipe VI (2014–present)	
	Fernando López Miras (born 1983)	8 September 2023	Incumbent	9 years and 176 days	PP	López Miras III; PP–Vox	2023	King; Felipe VI (2014–present)	

== Sources ==
- Rulers.org: Spain: Autonomous communities
