= Fernando López Miras =

Spanish politician

The Most Excellent Fernando López Miras
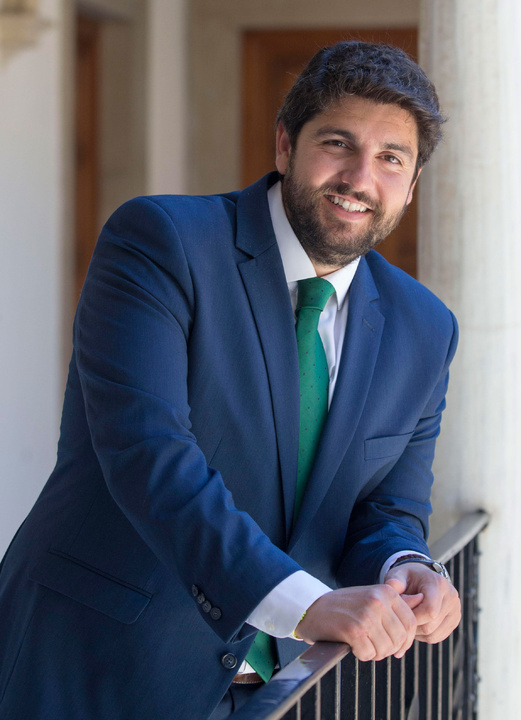

President of the Region of Murcia
- Incumbent
- Assumed office 3 May 2017
- Preceded by: Pedro Antonio Sánchez

Personal details
- Born: Fernando López Miras; 4 October 1983 (age 42) Lorca, Murcia, Spain
- Party: People's Party of the Region of Murcia

Fernando López Miras (born 4 October 1983) is a Spanish politician from the People's Party and President of the Region of Murcia since May 2017.
