= List of shipwrecks in 1813 =

The list of shipwrecks in 1813 includes ships sunk, wrecked or otherwise lost during 1813.

table of contents
1813
Jan	Feb	Mar	Apr
May	Jun	Jul	Aug
Sep	Oct	Nov	Dec
Unknown date

== January ==
=== 1 January ===
List of shipwrecks: 1 January 1813
Ship	State	Description
Euphrates	British East India Company	The East Indiaman foundered south of Ceylon. Her crew were rescued.
Gute Erwachting	Flag unknown	The ship departed from St. Ubes, Portugal for an American port. No further trace, presumed foundered with the loss of all hands.
HMS Java	Royal Navy	HMS Java exploding after being set ablaze. USS Constitution is at right. War of 1812: The Pallas-class frigate, which had been captured on 29 December 1812 by USS Constitution (United States Navy), was set afire, exploded, and sank in the Atlantic Ocean off the coast of Brazil.

=== 2 January ===
List of shipwrecks: 2 January 1813
Ship	State	Description
Ex	United Kingdom	The ship was wrecked at São Miguel, Azores with the loss of four of her crew.
Gloria	Portugal	The ship was abandoned off Faial Island, Azores. She was on a voyage from Madeira to Philadelphia, Pennsylvania, United States.
Juno	United Kingdom	The ship was lost near Galway. Her crew were rescued. She was on a voyage from Nova Scotia, British North America to Limerick and Greenock, Renfrewshire.
Thetis	United Kingdom	War of the Sixth Coalition: The ship was captured and burnt by a French privateer. She was on a voyage from Cork to Guernsey, Channel Islands.

=== 3 January ===
List of shipwrecks: 3 January 1813
Ship	State	Description
Magdalen	United Kingdom	The ship was run ashore near Dover, Kent. She was reflopated.

=== 5 January ===
List of shipwrecks: 5 January 1813
Ship	State	Description
Gypsey	United Kingdom	The ship sprang a leak and foundered in the North Sea off the mouth of the Humber. Her three crew survived. She was on a voyage from Hull, Yorkshire to London.
Rose in June	United Kingdom	War of the Sixth Coalition: Elbe and Hortense (both French Navy), captured and burnt the galliot. Rose in June was on a voyage from Sierra Leone to Gorée, Senegal.

=== 6 January ===
List of shipwrecks: 6 January 1813
Ship	State	Description
Senhora do Carmo	Portugal	The ship was wrecked near Cork, United Kingdom. She was on a voyage from Porto to Liverpool, Lancashire, United Kingdom.

=== 7 January ===
List of shipwrecks: 7 January 1813
Ship	State	Description
Dart	United Kingdom	The ship was sighted off Portland, Dorset whilst on a voyage from São Miguel, Azores to London. No further trace, presumed foundered with the loss of all hands.
Edward	France	War of the Sixth Coalition: The privateer was captured by HMS Derwent (Royal Navy). The two ships subsequently collided and Edward foundered. Her 40 crew were rescued.
HMS Ferret	Royal Navy	The Cruizer-class brig-sloop ran aground in the North Sea off Newbiggin-by-the-Sea, Northumberland and was wrecked. Her crew were rescued.

=== 8 January ===
List of shipwrecks: 8 January 1813
Ship	State	Description
Gipsey	United Kingdom	The ship foundered in the North Sea. Her crew were rescued. She was on a voyage from Hull, Yorkshire to London.
Johanna	United Kingdom	The ship was discovered abandoned off Start Point, Devon. She was on a voyage from Lisbon, Portugal to London. She was taken in to Torbay by HMS Piercer (Royal Navy).
Princess Royal	United Kingdom	The brig was wrecked on the Leshona Rock, off Porto, Portugal with the loss of six of her eight crew.

=== 9 January ===
List of shipwrecks: 9 January 1813
Ship	State	Description
Glasgow	United Kingdom	The ship was wrecked at Lopness, Orkney Islands. Her crew were rescued. She was on a voyage from Leith, Lothian, to Findhorn, Morayshire, Scotland.
Neva	Russia	During a voyage from Okhotsk in the Russian Empire to Novo-Arkhangelsk in Russian America carrying 77 people and a cargo of bronze guns, furs, and gold church vestments, the 370-ton ship was wrecked when she struck a rock in a bay – later named Neva Bay (57°09′N 134°17′W) – on the coast of Kruzof Island in the Alexander Archipelago in what is now Southeast Alaska. Forty-nine of those on board perished.
Tiger	United Kingdom	The transport ship was wrecked on the coast of Portugal at the mouth of the Tagus.

=== 11 January ===
List of shipwrecks: 11 January 1813
Ship	State	Description
Lark	United Kingdom	The ship ran aground on the Fairness Rock, off Margate, Kent. She was on a voyage from Newhaven, Sussex to London. She was refloated the next day and resumed her voyage.
Rose of Jersey	United Kingdom	The ship was wrecked at São Miguel, Azores.

=== 12 January ===
List of shipwrecks: 12 January 1813
Ship	State	Description
Nancy	(United Kingdom of Great Britain and Ireland) British North America	The ship was driven ashore on the Old Head of Kinsale, County Cork, United Kingdom. Her crew were rescued. Nancy was refloated in February and taken in to Kinsale, County Cork.
Tamerlane	France	War of 1812: The ship was chased and forced to ground off Cape Henry, Virginia, United States by HMS Tartarus (Royal Navy). The British prize crew abandoned it and came ashore as prisoners of war.

=== 13 January ===
List of shipwrecks: 13 January 1813
Ship	State	Description
Pemberton	United Kingdom	The ship was discovered in a waterlogged condition by HMS Trinculo (Royal Navy). Presumed subsequently foundered.

=== 14 January ===
List of shipwrecks: 14 January 1813
Ship	State	Description
Sagunto	Spanish Navy	The frigate sank after striking Cedar Ledge, a reef off Smuttynose Island in the Isles of Shoals, 6 nautical miles (11 km; 6.9 mi) off the coast of New Hampshire.

=== 16 January ===
List of shipwrecks: 16 January 1813
Ship	State	Description
Island	United Kingdom	The ship was wrecked on The Manacles. Her crew were rescued. She was on a voyage from Dartmouth, Devon to Dublin.
Rosamond	United States	War of 1812: The privateer was driven ashore at Puerto Cabello, Venezuela in an engagement with HMS Fawn (Royal Navy) with the loss of 25 of her crew.
Speculator	United Kingdom	The ship was driven ashore in the Berbice River. She was on a voyage from Berbice to London. Speculator was refloated on 3 March.

=== 17 January ===
List of shipwrecks: 17 January 1813
Ship	State	Description
Friends Adventure	United Kingdom	The ship was driven ashore near Lunenburg, Nova Scotia, British North America. She was on a voyage from Newfoundland to Halifax, Nova Scotia.
Teazer	United States	War of 1812: The privateer, a schooner, was captured by HMS San Domingo (Royal Navy). She was set afire and sunk.

=== 19 January ===
List of shipwrecks: 19 January 1813
Ship	State	Description
Economy	United States	The brig, a prize, was driven ashore at Liverpool, Nova Scotia, British North America.
Edward	United States	The schooner, a prize, was driven ashore at Liverpool, Nova Scotia.
Factor	United States	The full-rigged ship, a prize, was driven ashore at Liverpool, Nova Scotia.
Fly	United Kingdom	The ship capsized in the Atlantic Ocean with the loss of four lives.
Hiram	United States	The schooner, a prize, was driven ashore at Liverpool, Nova Scotia.
Landlady	(United Kingdom of Great Britain and Ireland) British North America	The schooner was driven ashore at Liverpool, Nova Scotia.
Liverpool	(United Kingdom of Great Britain and Ireland) British North America	The packet ship was driven ashore at Liverpool, Nova Scotia.
New Forge	(United Kingdom of Great Britain and Ireland) British North America	The schooner was driven ashore at Liverpool, Nova Scotia.
Parker and Sons	(United Kingdom of Great Britain and Ireland) British North America	The ship was driven ashore at Liverpool, Nova Scotia.
Polly	United States	The schooner was driven ashore at Liverpool, Nova Scotia.

=== 24 January ===
List of shipwrecks: 24 January 1813
Ship	State	Description
Young Ludowick	Flag unknown	The ship foundered in the Bay of Biscay. Her crew were rescued.
Rachel	United Kingdom	The ship was sailing from Newfoundland to Barbados when she encountered a gale at 41°34′N 46°52′W that dismasted her and reduced her to a complete wreck. she arrived on 11 February at Augra on Terceira Island where she was condemned.

=== 26 January ===
List of shipwrecks: 26 January 1813
Ship	State	Description
Alfred	United Kingdom	The ship struck a submerged rock in Plymouth Sound and foundered. Her crew were rescued.
Robert Bruce	United Kingdom	The ship struck a rock off Saint Thomas, Virgin Islands and was consequently beached. She was later refloated but found to be severely damaged. Robert Bruce was on a voyage from Surinam to London.

=== 27 January ===
List of shipwrecks: 27 January 1813
Ship	State	Description
HMS Daring	United Kingdom	War of the Sixth Coalition: The Archer-class gun-brig was run ashore and burnt in the Îles de Los to avoid capture by Aréthuse and Rubis (both French Navy).

=== 28 January ===
List of shipwrecks: 28 January 1813
Ship	State	Description
Conception	Spain	The ship was wrecked in the Isles of Shoals, United States with the loss of all hands. She was on a voyage from Cádiz to New York, United States.
Doubt	United Kingdom	The ship ran aground on the Horse Sand, in the North Sea. She was subsequently beached at Margate, Kent. Doubt was on a voyage from London to Penzance, Cornwall. She was later refloated.
Maria	Portugal	The ship was lost between Dodman Point and Falmouth, Cornwall, United Kingdom. She was on a voyage from Riga, Russia to Lisbon.

=== 29 January ===
List of shipwrecks: 29 January 1813
Ship	State	Description
John and Margaret	United Kingdom	The ship was lost on the Goodwin Sands, Kent. Her crew were rescued by a fishing boat. She was on a voyage from Sunderland, County Durham to Southampton, Hampshire.

=== 30 January ===
List of shipwrecks: 30 January 1813
Ship	State	Description
Restaurador	Portugal	The ship was wrecked at São Miguel, Azores.
Venus	United Kingdom	The ship departed from Dundalk, County Louth for Portsmouth, Hampshire. No further trace, presumed foundered with the loss of all hands.

=== Unknown date ===
List of shipwrecks: Unknown date in January 1813
Ship	State	Description
Ann	United Kingdom	The ship was driven ashore at Barrington, Rhode Island, United States.
Ann	United Kingdom	The ship was wrecked in the Orkney Islands. She was on a voyage from Pictou, Nova Scotia, British North America to Hull, Yorkshire.
Atalanta	United Kingdom	The ship foundered in the Grand Banks of Newfoundland on or after 21 January with the loss of all hands. She was on a voyage from Jamaica to London.
Citizen	United States	The ship was captured and sunk by Gloire (French Navy). She was on a voyage from St. Ubes, Portugal to Alexandria, Virginia.
Comet	United States	The privateer was wrecked at Beaufort, South Carolina in mid-January.
Confiancen	Sweden	The ship was wrecked near Uddevalla. She was on a voyage from London, United Kingdom to Holmstad.
Elizabeth	Prussia	The ship sank at Rügenwalde.
Euphemia	United Kingdom	The transport ship was lost on the Sunk Sand, in the North Sea off the coast of Essex.
Fanny	United Kingdom	The ship was driven ashore on "Dagen Island". She was on a voyage from London to Saint Petersburg, Russia.
Friendly	United Kingdom	The ship foundered in the Atlantic Ocean 80 leagues 240 nautical miles (440 km) off Cape Clear Island, County Cork. She was on a voyage from Saint Vincent to Bristol, Gloucestershire.
Hoffnung	Russia	The ship ran aground 8 nautical miles (15 km) off Pernau, Livonia, Russian Empire. She was on a voyage from Pernau to London.
Lagan	United Kingdom	The ship was wrecked at Donaghadee, County Down. She was on a voyage from Belfast, County Antrim to London.
Memel	United Kingdom	The ship was wrecked in the Orkney Islands. She was on a voyage from Pictou to Sunderland, County Durham.
Patriot	United States	The pilot boat was wrecked at Nags Head, North Carolina.
Pemberton	United Kingdom	The ship foundered on or after 19 January.
Phœbe	United Kingdom	The ship foundered in the Grand Banks of Newfoundland on or after 21 January with the loss of all hands. She was on a voyage from Jamaica to Belfast, County Antrim.
Resolution	United Kingdom	War of 1812: The ship was captured and burnt by USS Hornet (United States Navy). She was on a voyage from Liverpool to Rio de Janeiro and Maranhão, Brazil.
Sophia	United Kingdom	The ship sank at Rügenwald.
Susan	United Kingdom	The ship foundered in the Grand Banks of Newfoundland on or after 21 January with the loss of all hands. She was on a voyage from Jamaica to London.
Thomas and Mary	United Kingdom	The ship was driven ashore and wrecked at Southport, Lancashire. She was on a voyage from Strangford, County Down to Liverpool, Lancashire.
Versucht	Flag unknown	The ship was wrecked on Bornholm, Denmark. She was on a voyage from London to a Baltic port.
Vetus	United Kingdom	The East Indiaman was wrecked in the Isles of Scilly.
William Dent	United Kingdom	The ship foundered in the Grand Banks of Newfoundland on or after 21 January with the loss of all hands. She was on a voyage from Jamaica to London.
William Wilson	United States	War of the Sixth Coalition: The ship was captured and burnt by Gloire (French Navy) before 26 January.

== February ==
=== 1 February ===
List of shipwrecks: 1 February 1813
Ship	State	Description
Anna	United Kingdom	The ship was wrecked on the Cobler's Rocks, Barbados. She was on a voyage from London to Gibraltar.

=== 2 February ===
List of shipwrecks: 2 February 1813
Ship	State	Description
Dobridge	United Kingdom	War of the Sixth Coalition: The ship was captured and burnt by Elbe and Hortense (both French Navy).
Gloria	Portugal	The ship sprang a leak and was abandoned off Faial, Azores.
Printz Christian	Flag unknown	The ship caught fire at London, United Kingdom and was scuttled.
William	United Kingdom	The ship departed from Saint John, New Brunswick, British North America. No further trace, presumed foundered with the loss of all hands.

=== 3 February ===
List of shipwrecks: 3 February 1813
Ship	State	Description
Mary	United Kingdom	The ship struck a rock off the Saltee Islands, County Donegal and was abandoned by her crew in a sinking condition. She was on a voyage from Cork to Liverpool, Lancashire. She was subsequently driven ashore at Wexford and wrecked.

=== 4 February ===
List of shipwrecks: 4 February 1813
Ship	State	Description
General Doyle	United Kingdom	The ship was wrecked at Madeira, Portugal with the loss of two of her crew.
Madeira	Portugal	The brig was wrecked at Madeira.
Newry	United Kingdom	The ship sank at Liverpool, Lancashire.
Palafox	United Kingdom	War of the Sixth Coalition: The ship was captured in the Atlantic Ocean (44°30′N 15°00′W) by the letter of marque Eugene (France) whilst on a voyage from Plymouth, Devon to São Miguel, Azores. She was set afire and sunk.

=== 5 February ===
List of shipwrecks: 5 February 1813
Ship	State	Description
Printz Christian	Flag unknown	The ship caught fire in the River Thames and was scuttled.

=== 6 February ===
List of shipwrecks: 6 February 1813
Ship	State	Description
Rubis	French Navy	The Pallas-class frigate was driven aground off the Îles de Los, Rivières du Sud in a storm. She was subsequently set afire and scuttled by her crew, who were rescued by Aréthuse (French Navy).

=== 7 February ===
List of shipwrecks: 7 February 1813
Ship	State	Description
Firm	United Kingdom	The ship was sighted off Dartmouth, Devon. No further trace, presumed foundered with the loss of all hands. She was on a voyage from São Miguel Island, Azores to London.

=== 8 February ===
List of shipwrecks: 8 February 1813
Ship	State	Description
Delfin	United Kingdom	The schooner was wrecked on the Black Rocks, in the Bristol Channel off Porthcawl, Glamorgan. She was on a voyage from Cork to Bristol, Gloucestershire.
Isabella	United Kingdom	The brig was wrecked in the Falkland Islands. All 55 people on board survived. Her crew built a small barque from the wreck. Six of them sailed on 21 February and reached Buenos Aires 36 days later. HMS Nancy (Royal Navy) was despatched to rescue the remainder of her passengers and crew.
Star	United Kingdom	The ship was driven ashore near Wexford. She was on a voyage from Cork to Liverpool, Lancashire.
William	United Kingdom	The ship ran aground on the Fairness Rock. She was on a voyage from Exeter, Devon to London.

=== 9 February ===
List of shipwrecks: 9 February 1813
Ship	State	Description
Isabella	United Kingdom	The whaler was lost in the Falkland Islands. She was on a voyage from the South Seas to London.
Neptune	United Kingdom	The ship was wrecked near Whitehaven, Cumberland. Her crew were rescued. She was on a voyage from Wexford to Liverpool, Lancashire.
Spring	United Kingdom	The ship was driven ashore at Ramsgate, Kent. She was refloated and taken in to Ramsgate in a leaky condition.
Suir	United Kingdom	The ship capsized off Milford, Pembrokeshire. She was driven ashore and wrecked with the loss of all but three of her crew. Suir was on a voyage from Waterford to Newfoundland, British North America.
Unnamed	Flag unknown	The brig foundered off Portland, Dorset, United Kingdom with the loss of all hands.

=== 10 February ===
List of shipwrecks: 10 February 1813
Ship	State	Description
Rachel	United Kingdom	War of 1812: The ship was captured and burnt by the privateer Hazard (United States). She was on a voyage from Tortola to Cumaná, Captaincy General of Venezuela.
William Henry	United Kingdom	The ship was wrecked near Banff, Aberdeenshire. She was on a voyage from London to Newry, County Antrim.

=== 11 February ===
List of shipwrecks: 11 February 1813
Ship	State	Description
Wargrave	United Kingdom	The ship was run down and sunk by Severn (United Kingdom). Her crew were rescued by HMS Cressy (Royal Navy). Wargrave was on a voyage from Dublin to Surinam.

=== 12 February ===
List of shipwrecks: 12 February 1813
Ship	State	Description
William	United Kingdom	The ship ran aground on the Fairness Rock, Margate, Kent. She was on a voyage from Exeter, Devon to London.

=== 14 February ===
List of shipwrecks: 14 February 1813
Ship	State	Description
Margaret	United Kingdom	The ship was driven ashore and wrecked near Rye, Sussex. She was on a voyage from Lisbon, Portugal to London.
Mars	United Kingdom	The ship was driven ashore and wrecked near Oban, Argyllshire. She was on a voyage from Jamaica to the Clyde.

=== 15 February ===
List of shipwrecks: 15 February 1813
Ship	State	Description
Ann	United Kingdom	The ship foundered on this date.
Thirsk	United Kingdom	The ship was wrecked on the Scroby Sands, Norfolk with the loss of a crew member. She was on a voyage from London to Hull, Yorkshire.
William	United Kingdom	The ship was driven ashore at the mouth of the Humber. She was refloated the next day and was taken in to Bridlington, Yorkshire on 22 February.

=== 16 February ===
List of shipwrecks: 16 February 1813
Ship	State	Description
Eleanor	United Kingdom	The ship sank off Huntcliffe, Yorkshire. Her crew were rescued. She was on a voyage from Sunderland, County Durham to King's Lynn, Norfolk.
Eliza	United Kingdom	The ship was driven ashore near Southend, Essex. She was on a voyage from Cork to London. Eliza was refloated on 25 February and arrived at London.

=== 17 February ===
List of shipwrecks: 17 February 1813
Ship	State	Description
General Blake	United Kingdom	War of the Sixth Coalition: The ship, which had been previously captured by the privateer Comet (France), was lost on the French coast. She was on a voyage from Charleston, South Carolina, United States to Liverpool, Lancashire.
John	United Kingdom	The ship was lost in "Vintry Harbour". Her crew were rescued. She was on a voyage from Limerick to London.
Lancashire Witches	United Kingdom	The ship departed from Cayenne for Barbados. No further trace, presumed foundered with the loss of all hands.
Nimrod	United Kingdom	The ship was wrecked at Beachy Head, Sussex with the loss of twelve of her 24 crew. She was on a voyage from British Honduras to London.
Sarah	United Kingdom	The ship was driven ashore in the Humber.
Sunderland Packet	United Kingdom	The ship capsized and was driven ashore at Great Yarmouth, Norfolk.
Two unnamed vessels	United Kingdom	The ships were wrecked near Southend, Essex.

=== 18 February ===
List of shipwrecks: 18 February 1813
Ship	State	Description
Ceres	United Kingdom	The sloop was driven ashore near Margate, Kent.
Elizabeth	United Kingdom	The ship was wrecked on the West Rocks with the loss of all hands.
Gratitude	United Kingdom	The ship was run ashore at St. Mary's, Isles of Scilly. She was later refloated.
Marys	United Kingdom	The ship was driven ashore on Hare Island, County Galway.
Providence	United Kingdom	The ship was run ashore at St Mary's, Isles of Scilly. She was later refloated.
San Antonio	Spain	The brig was driven ashore and wrecked at Wilmington, Delaware, United States. Her crew were rescued.

=== 19 February ===
List of shipwrecks: 19 February 1813
Ship	State	Description
Vine	United Kingdom	The ship was run ashore near Spurn Point, Yorkshire. She floated off on 26 February.

=== 20 February ===
List of shipwrecks: 20 February 1813
Ship	State	Description
Adelphi	United Kingdom	The ship foundered off Surinam. Her crew survived.
Conceicão	Portugal	The ship was wrecked on Cromwell's Rock, in the River Suir. She was on a voyage from Waterford, United Kingdom to Lisbon.
Ganges	United Kingdom	The ship ran aground in the Surinam River. She was on a voyage from Malta to Surinam.
Peace	United Kingdom	The ship capsized at Dice Quay, London.
HMS Rhodian	Royal Navy	The 16-gun brig of war was wrecked 2 nautical miles (3.7 km) from Port Royal, Jamaica. Her crew were rescued.
Springfield	United Kingdom	The ship foundered in the North Sea 25 nautical miles (46 km) south by west of Lindesnes, Norway. Her crew were rescued by HM Hired armed ship Princess of Wales (Royal Navy).

=== 21 February ===
List of shipwrecks: 21 February 1813
Ship	State	Description
Gustaff Adolph	Sweden	The ship was driven ashore and severely damaged at Stromness, Orkney Islands, United Kingdom. She was on a voyage from Gothenburg to Liverpool, Lancashire, United Kingdom. Gustaff Adolph was later refloated and taken in to Liverpool.
Lark	United Kingdom	The ship departed Drogheda, County Louth for Whitehaven, Cumberland. No further trace, presumed foundered with the loss of all hands.

=== 22 February ===
List of shipwrecks: 22 February 1813
Ship	State	Description
Doris	United Kingdom	The schooner was wrecked at Cruden Bay, Aberdeenshire with the loss of 24 lives. She was on a voyage from Leith, Lothian to Lerwick, Shetland Islands.
Doubt	United Kingdom	The ship ran aground on the Horse Sand. She was on a voyage from London to Penzance, Cornwall. She was refloated but came ashore near Margate, Kent.
Lord Duncan	United Kingdom	The sloop was wrecked at Lamlash, Isle of Arran.
Manchester	United Kingdom	The ship collided with another vessel and foundered in the North Sea off Aldeburgh, Suffolk. Her crew were rescued. She was on a voyage from London to Stockworth.
Orion	Sweden	The ship was wrecked on Düne, Heligoland with the loss of four of her crew. She was on a voyage from Liverpool, Lancashire, United Kingdom to Stockholm.
Scipio	United Kingdom	The ship ran aground on the Middle Sand, in the North Sea off the coast of Essex. She was refloated and taken in to Harwich, Essex in a leaky condition.

=== 24 February ===
List of shipwrecks: 24 February 1813
Ship	State	Description
Conde de Santa Maria Lourenco	Portugal	The ship departed from New York, United States for Porto. No further trace, presumed foundered with the loss of all hands.
HMS Peacock	Royal Navy	War of 1812: The Cruizer-class brig-sloop was defeated and captured, but sank from damage sustained off the mouth of the Demerara River in an engagement with USS Hornet (United States Navy) with the loss of 38 of her 122 crew and three U.S. navy sailors who didn't get off in time.

=== 26 February ===
List of shipwrecks: 26 February 1813
Ship	State	Description
Elizabeth	United Kingdom	The ship was driven ashore near Scarborough, Yorkshire. Her crew were rescued. She was on a voyage from London to South Shields, County Durham.
Hoppett	United Kingdom	The ship was driven ashore near Waterford.

=== 27 February ===
List of shipwrecks: 27 February 1813
Ship	State	Description
Jane & Emma	United Kingdom	The ship was driven ashore at Lamlash, Arran. She was on a voyage from Glasgow, Renfrewshire to Liverpool, Lancashire.
Lavinia	United Kingdom	The ship was driven ashore and damaged at Lamlash. She was on a voyage from Glasgow to Liverpool. Lavinia was later refloated.

=== 28 February ===
List of shipwrecks: 28 February 1813
Ship	State	Description
Peter	United Kingdom	The ship foundered off Cork. She was on a voyage from Maranhão, Brazil to London.

=== Unknown date ===
List of shipwrecks: Unknown date in February 1813
Ship	State	Description
Ballasteros	Spain	The ship foundered off Gibraltar with the loss of all but two of her crew. She was on a voyage from Alicante to Cádiz.
Brothers	United Kingdom	The ship ran aground on the Nore. She was on a voyage from the River Thames to A Coruña, Spain. She was refloated and put back to the River Thames.
Comet	United Kingdom	The ship was driven ashore near Colberg. She was on a voyage from London to a Baltic port. She was later refloated and taken in to Colberg.
Diligence	(United Kingdom of Great Britain and Ireland) British North America	The ship was wrecked in the Bay of Fundy. Her crew were rescued. The wreck was subsequently burnt. Diligence was on a voyage from London to Halifax, Nova Scotia and Saint John, New Brunswick.
Fortitude	United Kingdom	The ship ran aground on the Maplin Sand, in the North Sea off the coast of Essex. She was refloated.
Hair Trunk	United Kingdom	The ship ran aground at the mouth of the River Burry. She was on a voyage from Terceira Island, Azores to London.
Hawke	United Kingdom	The ship was wrecked in the Farne Islands. She was on a voyage from "Dudden" to Hull, Yorkshire.
Isabella	United Kingdom	The ship was lost in the River Dee. Her crew were rescued. She was on a voyage from Wicklow to Liverpool, Lancashire.
Newry	United Kingdom	The ship was holed by an anchor and sank at Liverpool.
Ocean	United Kingdom	The ship ran aground on the Maplin Sand. She was refloated.
Resistance	Sweden	The ship was wrecked on Læsø in early February with the loss of all hands. She was on a voyage from Liverpool to Stockholm.
Stag	United Kingdom	The ship was driven ashore on Madeira. She was on a voyage from Newfoundland, British North America to Madeira.
Sultan	United Kingdom	The brig foundered off Acheen on or around 3 February. Her thirteen crew survived the sinking, but only four survived to land at Ceylon on 17 February.
Triton	United Kingdom	The ship was wrecked in the Tagus.

== March ==
=== 1 March ===
List of shipwrecks: 1 March 1813
Ship	State	Description
James and Mary	United Kingdom	The ship was wrecked on the Herd Sand, in the North Sea off North Shields, County Durham. She was on a voyage from Lisbon, Portugal to Newcastle-upon-Tyne, Northumberland.
Pomona	United Kingdom	The ship capsized and sank in the Irish Sea off Amlwch, Anglesey. Her crew were rescued. She was on a voyage from Waterford to Liverpool, Lancashire.

=== 4 March ===
List of shipwrecks: 4 March 1813
Ship	State	Description
Virgine de Dolores	Spain	The ship struck a rock and foundered at Malta. She was on a voyage from Malta to a port in Catalonia.

=== 5 March ===
List of shipwrecks: 5 March 1813
Ship	State	Description
Lark	United Kingdom	The brig was wrecked in the Solway Firth. She was on a voyage from Drogheda, County Louth to Whitehaven, Cumberland.
Nymph	United States	War of 1812: The ship was captured by HMS Blazer and HMS Thrasher (both Royal Navy) and was sent in to Heligoland. She was wrecked on Düne on 7 March. Nymph was on a voyage from New York to Amsterdam, Zuyderzée, France.
Ruby	United Kingdom	The ship was driven ashore at Blakeney, Norfolk. She was on a voyage from London to Newcastle-upon-Tyne, Northumberland.

=== 6 March ===
List of shipwrecks: 6 March 1813
Ship	State	Description
Enigheden	(Denmark) Norway	The brig was wrecked on Westray, Orkney Islands, United Kingdom of Great Britain and Ireland with the loss of all hands.

=== 11 March ===
List of shipwrecks: 11 March 1813
Ship	State	Description
Ayr	United Kingdom	The ship was run ashore near Penzance, Cornwall. She was on a voyage from Southampton, Hampshire to St. Ives, Cornwall. She was refloated and taken in to Penzance.
Hope	United Kingdom	The ship was run ashore and severely damaged near Liverpool, Lancashire. She was on a voyage from Liverpool to Madeira. Hope was later refloated.
Mutual	United Kingdom	The ship was driven ashore at Corton, Suffolk. She was on a voyage from Portsmouth, Hampshire to Sunderland, County Durham.

=== 12 March ===
List of shipwrecks: 12 March 1813
Ship	State	Description
Active	United Kingdom	The ship was driven ashore between Dover and Folkestone, Kent. Her crew were rescued. She was on a voyage from Plymouth, Devon to London.
Alert	United Kingdom	The ship was run into by a brig in Mount's Bay and was severely damaged. She was on a voyage from London to Newry, County Antrim.

=== 15 March ===
List of shipwrecks: 15 March 1813
Ship	State	Description
Good Advice	United Kingdom	The ship was driven ashore at Brook, Isle of Wight. She was on a voyage from Penzance, Cornwall to Portsmouth, Hampshire.

=== 16 March ===
List of shipwrecks: 16 March 1813
Ship	State	Description
Ark	United Kingdom	The ship ran around on a sandbank off Saltfleet, Lincolnshire and was wrecked. She was on a voyage from London to Leeds, Yorkshire. Ark was later refloated.
Peggy	United Kingdom	The ship capsized in a squall in the Mediterranean Sea with the loss of four lives.

=== 21 March ===
List of shipwrecks: 21 March 1813
Ship	State	Description
Elizabeth	United Kingdom	The ship was driven ashore at Spurn Point, Yorkshire. She was on a voyage from London to Hull, Yorkshire.

=== 22 March ===
List of shipwrecks: 22 March 1813
Ship	State	Description
HMS Captain	Royal Navy	The Canada-class ship of the line was destroyed by fire in the Hamoaze with the loss of two of her crew.

=== 23 March ===
List of shipwrecks: 23 March 1813
Ship	State	Description
Pelham	United Kingdom	War of 1812: The ship was captured and burnt by the privateer Globe (United States). She was on a voyage from Lisbon to Figueira da Foz, Portugal.

=== 25 March ===
List of shipwrecks: 25 March 1813
Ship	State	Description
Derejada de Paz	Portugal	War of the Sixth Coalition: The ship was captured and burnt by a French vessel.
Ruby	Portugal	War of the Sixth Coalition: The ship was captured and burnt by a French vessel.

=== 27 March ===
List of shipwrecks: 27 March 1813
Ship	State	Description
Success	War of the Sixth Coalition: United States	The ship was captured by Aréthuse (French Navy) whilst on a voyage from Boston, Massachusetts, to Cádiz, Spain and was sunk by her.

=== 28 March ===
List of shipwrecks: 28 March 1813
Ship	State	Description
Abundancio	Spain	The ship was driven ashore near Algeciras.
Alexandro	Spain	The ship was driven ashore and wrecked near Algeciras.
Columbo	United Kingdom	The ship was lost at Gibraltar. She was on a voyage from Malta to the Clyde.
Dostermanus	Spain	The ship was driven ashore and wrecked near Algeciras. She was on a voyage from Oran, Algeria to Algeciras.
Fortuna	Spain	The ship was driven ashore near Algeciras. She was on a voyage from Oran to Gibraltar.
Regent	United Kingdom	The ship was driven ashore and wrecked at Algeciras. She was on a voyage from Malta to Lisbon, Portugal.
Sarah	United Kingdom	The ship was lost at Gibraltar. She was on a voyage from Limerick to Mallorca, Spain.
Valiente	Spain	The ship was driven ashore and wrecked at Algeciras.

=== 29 March ===
List of shipwrecks: 29 March 1813
Ship	State	Description
Louisa	United States	The ship was lost near Cape Negro, Nova Scotia, British North America. Her crew were rescued. She was on a voyage from Lisbon, Portugal to New York.

=== Unknown date ===
List of shipwrecks: Unknown date in March 1813
Ship	State	Description
Alexander	United Kingdom	War of the Sixth Coalition: The brig was captured by the privateer Miquelonnaise (France) between 26 and 30 March whilst on a voyage from London to Lisbon, Portugal. She was set afire and sunk.
Amazon	Portugal	The ship was wrecked on the coast of the United States in late March. She was on a voyage from Lisbon to Boston, Massachusetts.
Braganza	Portugal	The ship ran aground in the River Shannon. She was on a voyage from São Miguel Island, Azores to London.
Catharine and Mary	United Kingdom	The ship was driven ashore and wrecked at Southport, Lancashire, with the loss of two of her crew. She was on a voyage from Wexford to Liverpool, Lancashire.
Confiance	(United Kingdom of Great Britain and Ireland) Jamaica	The ship was lost near Carthagena, Viceroyalty of New Granada in late March.
Elizabeth	United Kingdom	War of 1812: The ship was captured in the Atlantic Ocean off the Berlengas, Portugal by the privateer Globe (United States). She was set afire and sunk.
Endeavour	(United Kingdom of Great Britain and Ireland) New South Wales	The ship was wrecked at the mouth of the Shoalhaven River. Her crew survived.
Enterprize	United Kingdom	The ship was driven ashore and wrecked at Southport. She was on a voyage from Newfoundland to Ross and Liverpool.
Gatcomb	United Kingdom	The ship was driven ashore and wrecked at Ardglass, County Down. She was on a voyage from Lisbon to Belfast, County Antrim.
Hercules	United Kingdom	The ship was driven ashore. She was on a voyage from the River Thames to the Cape of Good Hope, Cape Colony. She was refloated and put back to the River Thames on 6 February.
Leopard	United Kingdom	War of 1812: The schooner was captured and sunk in Dublin Bay by the privateer True Blooded Yankee (United States).
Mary Ann	United Kingdom	War of 1812: The ship was captured and burnt by the privateer Yankee (United States).
Mary Hall	United Kingdom	The ship was driven ashore at Lytham St. Annes, Lancashire. She was on a voyage from Waterford to Liverpool.
Mercury	(United Kingdom of Great Britain and Ireland) New South Wales	The ship was wrecked at the mouth of the Shoalhaven River. Her crew survived.
Seaton	United Kingdom	War of 1812: The ship was captured by the privateer Paul Jones (United States). She was set afire and sunk.
Speculant	United Kingdom	The ship was lost in the Eyder.
Urbano	United Kingdom	The ship was driven ashore. She was on a voyage from the River Thames to the Île de France. She was refloated and put back to the River Thames on 6 March.

== April ==
=== 1 April ===
List of shipwrecks: 1 April 1813
Ship	State	Description
USS Gallatin	United States Navy	The ship exploded and sank at Charleston, South Carolina with the loss of three of her crew.
Harmony	United Kingdom	The ship was driven ashore near Wexford.
Hercules	United Kingdom	The whaler was driven ashore at Aberdeen.
Industry	United Kingdom	The ship foundered in the Irish Sea off the Isle of Man. Her crew were rescued.
John and Hannah	United Kingdom	The ship sprang a leak and sank in the North Sea off Sunderland, County Durham. Her crew were rescued. She was on a voyage from Newcastle-upon-Tyne, Northumberland to London.
Master Mason	United Kingdom	The ship was driven ashore at Ramsgate, Kent. She was on a voyage from Dover, Kent to Portsmouth, Hampshire.
Oscar	United Kingdom	The whaler was driven ashore and wrecked at Aberdeen with the loss of all 48 crew.
Providence	United Kingdom	The ship was driven ashore at Southsea, Hampshire. She was on a voyage from Poole, Dorset to London.
Sophia	United Kingdom	The ship was driven ashore near Wexford.
True Briton	United Kingdom	The ship foundered in the Irish Sea off Great Orme, Caernarfonshire with the loss of a crew member. Survivors were rescued by Neptune (United Kingdom). She was on a voyage from Aberystwyth, Cardiganshire to Liverpool, Lancashire.
Valentine	United Kingdom	The ship foundered in Belfast Lough. Her crew were rescued.

=== 2 April ===
List of shipwrecks: 2 April 1813
Ship	State	Description
Asia	India	The ship foundered in the Indian Ocean (approximately 10°S 85°E). Her crew took to the boats. Thirty of them, in one of the boats, reached "Quodah" on 15 May.

=== 3 April ===
List of shipwrecks: 3 April 1813
Ship	State	Description
Dumfries	United Kingdom	The ship was wrecked at Formby, Lancashire. She was on a voyage from Bristol, Gloucestershire to Liverpool, Lancashire.

=== 5 April ===
List of shipwrecks: 5 April 1813
Ship	State	Description
Lune	United Kingdom	The ship was driven ashore near Dover, Kent. She was on a voyage from Lymington, Hampshire to Sunderland, County Durham. She was refloated and taken in to Dover the next day in a leaky condition.

=== 6 April ===
List of shipwrecks: 6 April 1813
Ship	State	Description
Harmony	United Kingdom	The ship was wrecked on the English Bank, in the River Plate. Her crew were rescued. She was on a voyage from London to Buenos Aires.
John	United Kingdom	The ship was driven ashore and sank near Visby, Sweden. She was on a voyage from Stockholm, Sweden to London. John was later refloated and taken in to Carlshamn for repairs.
Twee Gesusters	Flag unknown	The ship was driven ashore at Helsingborg, Sweden. She was on a voyage from Saint Petersburg, Russia to London. She was later refloated and taken in to Gothenburg, Sweden.

== =7 April ==
List of shipwrecks: 7 April 1813
Ship	State	Description
HMS Mulgrave	Royal Navy	The Vengeur-class ship of the line was run ashore near South Foreland, Kent. She was refloated and sailed for Portsmouth, Hampshire.

=== 8 April ===
List of shipwrecks: 8 April 1813
Ship	State	Description
Unity	(United Kingdom of Great Britain and Ireland) New South Wales	The schooner, which had been stolen by seven transported convicts, was last seen off the mouth of the Derwent River. No further trace, presumed foundered with the loss of all hands.

=== 12 April ===
List of shipwrecks: 12 April 1813
Ship	State	Description
Colonel Bloomfield	United Kingdom	The schooner departed from Dartmouth, Devon for London. No further trace, presumed foundered with the loss of all hands.

=== 14 April ===
List of shipwrecks: 14 April 1813
Ship	State	Description
Grenville	United States	The ship was wrecked on the American coast. She was on a voyage from Cádiz, Spain to Portsmouth, New Hampshire.

=== 15 April ===
List of shipwrecks: 15 April 1813
Ship	State	Description
Hope	United Kingdom	The ship was wrecked at Flamborough Head, Yorkshire. She was on a voyage from South Shields, County Durham to London.

=== 16 April ===
List of shipwrecks: 16 April 1813
Ship	State	Description
Two Elizas	United Kingdom	The ship departed from the Nore for Heligoland. No further trace, presumed foundered in the North Sea with the loss of all hands.
Marquis Wellesley	British East India Company	The East Indiaman ran aground at Bombay, India and foundered. She was subsequently reported to be a complete wreck by 24 April.

=== 17 April ===
List of shipwrecks: 17 April 1813
Ship	State	Description
Cerberus	United Kingdom	War of the Sixth Coalition: The privateer was captured and burnt off The Lizard, Cornwall by Aréthuse (French Navy).
Invincible Gerona	United Kingdom	The ship was driven ashore at Blackwall Point, Middlesex. She was on a voyage from London to Gibraltar. She was refloated.
St Johannes	Spain	The ship was wrecked on the Isle of Purbeck, Dorset, United Kingdom. She was on a voyage from Seville to London.

=== 18 April ===
List of shipwrecks: 18 April 1813
Ship	State	Description
Lively	United Kingdom	The ship was lost near Manchioneal, Jamaica. Her crew were rescued. She was on a voyage from Manchioneal to London.

=== 20 April ===
List of shipwrecks: 21 April 1813
Ship	State	Description
Unnamed	United Kingdom	The sloop foundered in the Humber off Hessle, Yorkshire with the loss of one of her two crew.

=== 21 April ===
List of shipwrecks: 21 April 1813
Ship	State	Description
Success	United Kingdom	The ship collided with another vessel off Düne. She was beached but sank Success was on a voyage from London to Heligoland.

=== 22 April ===
List of shipwrecks: 22 April 1813
Ship	State	Description
Mary Ann	Russia	The ship ran aground on Scroby Sands, Norfolk, United Kingdom. She was on a voyage from Saint Petersburg to London, United Kingdom. She floated off on 28 April, came ashore and was wrecked.

=== 24 April ===
List of shipwrecks: 24 April 1813
Ship	State	Description
Mullett	United Kingdom	The ship put into Plymouth, as did London Packet, Annett master. Mullett was sailing from Plymouth to Suriname and London Packet was sailing from London to Havana when they ran foul of each other.
Robert	United Kingdom	The ship ran aground in the River Plate.

=== 26 April ===
List of shipwrecks: 26 April 1813
Ship	State	Description
Gute Mutter	Flag unknown	The ship was driven ashore on the coast of Lincolnshire, United Kingdom. Her crew were rescued. She was on a voyage from Saint Petersburg, Russia to Hull, Yorkshire, United Kingdom.
Sir Godfrey Webster	United Kingdom	The East Indiaman was dismasted in a storm in the Indian Ocean off Mauritius during a voyage from Bengal, India, to London. She put into Bombay on 5 June for repairs.
Veritas	Denmark	The ship was driven ashore and wrecked at St. Abb's Head, Berwickshire with the loss of all hands.

=== 27 April ===
List of shipwrecks: 27 April 1813
Ship	State	Description
Argo	United Kingdom	The ship was wrecked near Dunfanaghy, County Donegal. She was on a voyage from Liverpool, Lancashire to Stockholm, Sweden.
Princess	United Kingdom	The ship was wrecked at Cape Cod, Massachusetts, United States. Her crew were rescued. She was on a voyage from London to New York.
Whampoa	United States	War of 1812: The ship was driven ashore at Newport, Rhode Island by HMS Orpheus (Royal Navy). An attempt to capture the ship was repelled from the shore.

=== 28 April ===
List of shipwrecks: 28 April 1813
Ship	State	Description
Golconda	United Kingdom	The ship was driven ashore in the Tagus. She was later refloated.
Henderson	United Kingdom	The ship was driven ashore in Loch Eynoch. She was on a voyage from Liverpool, Lancashire to Riga, Russia.
Virgin de los Remedos	Spain	The ship was driven ashore at Gibraltar. Her crew were rescued.
Walter	United States	The ship was driven ashore and severely damaged in the Tagus.

=== 29 April ===
List of shipwrecks: 29 April 1813
Ship	State	Description
Unnamed	Swedish Navy	The frigate foundered between "Steynes" and Falsterbo. There were eight survivors from around 130 people on board. She was on a voyage from Karlskrona to Malmö.

=== 30 April ===
List of shipwrecks: 30 April 1813
Ship	State	Description
Beamish	United Kingdom	The ship was driven ashore at Bridlington, Yorkshire.
Fame	United Kingdom	The ship was driven ashore at Sheerness, Kent. She was on a voyage from Guernsey, Channel Islands to Gothenburg, Sweden. Fame was later refloated.
Friends	United Kingdom	The ship was driven ashore at Bridlington.
Galatea	United Kingdom	The transport ship was driven ashore at Sheerness. She was on a voyage from Woolwich, Kent to Kolberg, Prussia. Galatea was later refloated and taken in to Sheerness.
Martha	United Kingdom	The ship was driven ashore at Bridlington.
Minerva	United Kingdom	The ship was driven ashore. She was on a voyage from London to a Baltic port. She was refloated and taken in to Harwich, Essex.
Nancy	United Kingdom	The brig was wrecked on St Nicholas Island, Devon. Her crew were rescued.

=== Unknown date ===
List of shipwrecks: Unknown date in April 1813
Ship	State	Description
Bom Successo	Portugal	War of the Sixth Coalition: The ship was captured and burnt off Cape Clear Island, County Cork, United Kingdom by a French Navy frigate after 9 April. She was on a voyage from Liverpool, Lancashire, United Kingdom to Lisbon.
Cognac Packet	United Kingdom	The ship capsized and sank in the Atlantic Ocean between 21 April and 1 May.
Elizabeth	United Kingdom	The ship was driven ashore near Seaford, Sussex. She was on a voyage from Lisbon, Portugal to London.
Fortuna	(Denmark) Norway	The ship was wrecked near Holmstadt. She was on a voyage from Holmstadt to Leith, Lothian, United Kingdom.
General Balasteros	Spain	War of the Sixth Coalition: The ship was captured by the privateer Diligence (France). She was set afire and sunk.
General Grew Schmittow	(Denmark) Norway	The ship foundered in the North Sea on or about 20 April with the loss of five of her crew. She was on a voyage from Trondheim to Belfast, County Antrim, United Kingdom.
Latona	United Kingdom	War of 1812: The ship was captured and burnt by Sabine (United States). She was on a voyage from Lisbon to London.
London Packet	United Kingdom	War of 1812: The ship, which had been captured by the privateer Paul Jones (United States) on 3 February, was wrecked near Nantucket, Massachusetts, United States. London Packet was on a voyage from Spithead, Hampshire to Havana, Cuba.
Maria	United Kingdom	The ship was driven ashore near Algeciras, Spain. She was on a voyage from Malta to Dublin.
Mary	United Kingdom	The ship ran aground on the Hoyle Bank, in Liverpool Bay. She was on a voyage from Liverpool, Lancashire to Malta. Mary was later refloated and returned to Liverpool for repairs.
Nora	United Kingdom	The ship was driven ashore on Læsø, Denmark.
Seara	Portugal	War of the Sixth Coalition: The full-rigged ship was captured and burnt off Madeira by Aréthuse (French Navy).

== May ==
=== 1 May ===
List of shipwrecks: 1 May 1813
Ship	State	Description
Hope	United Kingdom	The ship was lost off the mouth of the Humber. Her crew were rescued by lifeboat. Hope was on a voyage from Heligoland to Hull, Yorkshire.

=== 3 May ===
List of shipwrecks: 3 May 1813
Ship	State	Description
Two unnamed vessels	United Kingdom	War of 1812:The ships were captured by the privateer America (United States) in the Atlantic Ocean. They were left adrift.

=== 5 May ===
List of shipwrecks: 5 May 1813
Ship	State	Description
Thomas	United Kingdom	The ship struck a rock between Buck Island and Saint Thomas, Virgin Islands. She was consequently beached at Saint Thomas. Thomas was on a voyage from Saint Vincent to Bristol, Gloucestershire.

=== 7 May ===
List of shipwrecks: 7 May 1813
Ship	State	Description
Jonge Pieter	Flag unknown	The ship capsized at Plymouth, Devon, United Kingdom.

=== 8 May ===
List of shipwrecks: 8 May 1813
Ship	State	Description
Hartley	United Kingdom	War of 1812: The ship was captured by the privateer Governor Tompkins (United States). She was burnt the next day.

=== 10 May ===
List of shipwrecks: 10 May 1813
Ship	State	Description
Fox	United Kingdom	War of 1812: The ship was captured by an American privateer 35 leagues (105 nautical miles (194 km)) off Cape Clear Island, County Cork but sank due to battle damage. Three of her crew were killed in the engagement.

=== 16 May ===
List of shipwrecks: 16 May 1813
Ship	State	Description
Commerce	United Kingdom	The ship was abandoned off the Isles of Scilly. She was on a voyage from Cork to Southampton, Hampshire. Commerce was later boarded and taken in to Penzance, Cornwall.

=== 19 May ===
List of shipwrecks: 19 May 1813
Ship	State	Description
Jane	United Kingdom	War of 1812: The ship was captured and destroyed by USS Congress (United States Navy). She was on a voyage from Buenos Aires to Greenock, Renfrewshire.
Magdalen	United States	The ship, a prize of HMS Superb (Royal Navy), caught fire at Plymouth, Devon, United Kingdom and was scuttled.

=== 20 May ===
List of shipwrecks: 20 May 1813
Ship	State	Description
HMS Algerine	Royal Navy	The Pigmy-class schooner was wrecked on the Little Bahama Bank. Her crew survived.

=== 23 May ===
List of shipwrecks: 23 May 1813
Ship	State	Description
General Wellesley	United Kingdom	The brig struck ice and foundered off Newfoundland, British North America.
Latonia	United Kingdom	The ship struck ice and foundered off the coast of Greenland. Her crew were rescued.
Leo	United Kingdom	The ship was wrecked on the coast of Bahia, Brazil.

=== 24 May ===
List of shipwrecks: 24 May 1813
Ship	State	Description
Hope	United Kingdom	The ship was lost at St. John's, Newfoundland. She was on a voyage from the Clyde to St. John's.
Three unnamed vessels	Flags unknown	The ships were sunk or wrecked at St. John's, Newfoundland.
Unnamed	Flag unknown	The ship was lost in the Bay of Bulls.
Unnamed	Flag unknown	The ship was lost off Petty Harbour, Newfoundland.

=== 27 May ===
List of shipwrecks: 27 May 1813
Ship	State	Description
Sir Isaac Brock	United Kingdom	War of 1812, Battle of York: The uncompleted brig of war was burnt on the stocks at Kingston, Royal Naval Dockyard, Upper Canada, British North America to prevent capture by the Americans.

=== 29 May ===
List of shipwrecks: 29 May 1813
Ship	State	Description
USS Duke of Gloucester	United States Navy	War of 1812, Second Battle of Sackett's Harbor: The brig of war was destroyed to prevent capture by the British.
USS General Pike	United States	War of 1812, Second Battle of Sackett's Harbor: The corvette, which was then under construction, was set afire to prevent capture by the British. Later salvaged, completed and commissioned.

=== 30 May ===
List of shipwrecks: 30 May 1813
Ship	State	Description
Eliza	United Kingdom	The brig foundered in the Atlantic Ocean. Her crew were rescued. She was on a voyage from Jamaica to London.

=== Unknown date ===
List of shipwrecks: Unknown date in May 1813
Ship	State	Description
Actaeon	United States	War of 1812: The ship was captured and burnt by HMS Hogue (Royal Navy) in mid-May. She was on a voyage from Cádiz, Spain to Boston, Massachusetts.
Ann	United Kingdom	The ship was driven ashore at Barrington, New Jersey, United States.
Diana	United Kingdom	War of the Sixth Coalition: The ship was captured and destroyed by the privateer Lion (France) after 30 April. She was on a voyage from Porto, Portugal to Newfoundland, British North America.
Effort	United Kingdom	The ship was driven ashore at Gibraltar. She was on a voyage from Gibraltar to London.
Floribunda	Stralsund	The ship foundered in the Baltic Sea. Her crew were rescued. She was on a voyage from Stralsund to London.
George	United Kingdom	The ship was driven ashore on Gotland, Sweden. She was later refloated and put into "Fahrsund". George was on a voyage from "Wyburgh" to an English port.
Hope	United Kingdom	The ship was lost off Spurn Point, Yorkshire.
Iris	United Kingdom	The ship was abandoned in the Atlantic Ocean. All on board were rescued by Fidelity (United Kingdom). Iris was on a voyage from Cork to Newfoundland, British North America.
James and Margaret	United Kingdom	The ship was driven ashore and wrecked near Boston, Lincolnshire. Her crew were rescued. She was on a voyage from Sunderland, County Durham to Boston.
Johanna	United Kingdom	The ship was driven ashore and wrecked near Saint Petersburg, Russia. She was on a voyage from Aberdeen to Saint Petersburg.
Porsgrund	(Denmark) Norway	The ship foundered in the North Sea.
Sally	United Kingdom	The ship was driven ashore near Saltfleet, Lincolnshire. She was later refloated and taken in to Grimsby.
Sprightly	United Kingdom	War of 1812: The ship was captured and burnt by an American letter of marque. She was on a voyage from Lisbon, Portugal to London.
Veritas	United Kingdom	The ship was wrecked near Eyemouth, Berwickshire.

== June ==
=== 1 June ===
List of shipwrecks: 1 June 1813
Ship	State	Description
Echo	United Kingdom	The ship was lost off Rio de Janeiro. Eleven of her crew were rescued. She was on a voyage from Rio de Janeiro to Pernambuco, Brazil.

=== 4 June ===
List of shipwrecks: 4 June 1813
Ship	State	Description
Princess of Brazil	United Kingdom	The ship foundered in the Atlantic Ocean with the loss of most of her crew. She was on a voyage from Rio de Janeiro to Lisbon, Portugal.
Harriet	United Kingdom	The ship foundered in the Bristol Channel off St Ann's Head, Pembrokeshire. She was on a voyage from London to Liverpool, Lancashire.

=== 9 June ===
List of shipwrecks: 11 June 1813
Ship	State	Description
Trident	United Kingdom	Gunboat War: The ship was captured and burnt in the Great Belt by Royal Danish Navy gunboats. She was on a voyage from London to Saint Petersburgh, Russia.

=== 11 June ===
List of shipwrecks: 11 June 1813
Ship	State	Description
Cork Rump	United Kingdom	The ship was driven ashore and damaged near Poole, Dorset. She was on a voyage from Guernsey, Channel Islands to Portsmouth, Hampshire.

=== 13 June ===
List of shipwrecks: 13 June 1813
Ship	State	Description
Festin	French Navy	The corvette ran aground at Brest, Finistère. She was refloated but was subsequently withdrawn from service.

=== 14 June ===
List of shipwrecks: 14 June 1813
Ship	State	Description
Harriet	United Kingdom	War of 1812: The ship was captured and destroyed by the privateer Fox (United States). Harriet was on a voyage from Newfoundland, British North America to London.
Nelly & Peggy	United Kingdom	War of 1812: The ship was captured and destroyed by the privateer Fox (United States). Nelly & Peggy was on a voyage from Cork to Miramichi, New Brunswick, British North America.

=== 16 June ===
List of shipwrecks: 16 June 1813
Ship	State	Description
Joanna	United Kingdom	The ship was wrecked at Aberdeen. She was on a voyage from Aberdeen to Saint Petersburg, Russia.

=== 20 June ===
List of shipwrecks: 20 June 1813
Ship	State	Description
Olive Branch	United Kingdom	The ship departed from Liverpool, Lancashire for London. No further trace, presumed foundered with the loss of all hands.

=== 21 June ===
List of shipwrecks: 21 June 1813
Ship	State	Description
Adriatic	United Kingdom	The ship was wrecked on the Haisborough Sands, in the North Sea off the coast of Norfolk. Her crew were rescued. She was on a voyage from South Shields, County Durham to London.

=== 26 June ===
List of shipwrecks: 26 June 1813
Ship	State	Description
Fox Packet	United Kingdom	War of 1812: The ship, which had been captured by the privateer Fox (United States) on 17 June, was recaptured by Superior (United Kingdom) and was scuttled. She was on a voyage from Greenock, Renfrewshire to Limerick.
HMS Persian	Royal Navy	HMS Persian. The Cruizer-class brig-sloop ran aground on the Silver Cays sandbank, off the north coast of Hispaniola. She was refloated but consequently foundered. All 126 crew survived.

=== 27 June ===
List of shipwrecks: 27 June 1813
Ship	State	Description
Mars	United Kingdom	The ship struck a rock at Plymouth, Devon and was wrecked.
Quiz	United Kingdom	The ship capsized 10 nautical miles (19 km) off Guadeloupe with the loss of seven lives. She was on a voyage from Guadeloupe to London.
Young Teazer	United States	War of 1812: The schooner was scuttled by her crew at Lunenburg, Nova Scotia, British North America with the loss of 30 of her 38 crew.

=== 28 June ===
List of shipwrecks: 28 June 1813
Ship	State	Description
Ramoncita	United Kingdom	The ship capsized in the Demerara River. She was declared a total loss.

=== Unknown date ===
List of shipwrecks: Unknown date in June 1813
Ship	State	Description
Alfred	United Kingdom	The transport ship was lost at the mouth of the Ebro. The archaeological site is known as Deltebre I.
Bee	United Kingdom	The ship sank at Ramsgate, Kent.
Elizabeth	United Kingdom	The ship was wrecked on the Shipwash Sand, in the North Sea. Her crew were rescued. She was on a voyage from North Shields, County Durham to London.
Harlequin	United Kingdom	The transport ship was lost at the mouth of the Ebro. The archaeological site is known as Deltebre I.
Hector	Sweden	The ship was driven ashore on Saaremaa, Russia. She was on a voyage from Stockholm to Riga, Russia.
Helen	United Kingdom	War of 1812: The ship was captured by an American privateer in the Gulf of St. Lawrence and was burnt. She was on a voyage from Poole, Dorset to a port in British North America.
Lady Emily Packet	United Kingdom	The ship was lost near Bermuda. All on board were rescued.
Magnum Bonum	United Kingdom	The transport ship was lost at the mouth of the Ebro. The archaeological site is known as Deltebre I.
Minerva	United Kingdom	The ship was in collision with another vessel and was beached in the Malmö Channel. She was later refloated and taken in to Karlskrona, Sweden for repairs.
Prince of Brazil	United Kingdom	The ship was lost north of the "Toro". She was on a voyage from Rio de Janeiro to Lisbon, Portugal.
Southampton	United Kingdom	The transport ship was lost at the mouth of the Ebro. The archaeological site is known as Deltebre I.
Trafalgar	United Kingdom	The ship was wrecked 7 nautical miles (13 km) west of Tobago. She was on a voyage from Tobago to Bristol, Gloucestershire.

== July ==
=== 2 July ===
List of shipwrecks: 2 July 1813
Ship	State	Description
HMS Daedalus	Royal Navy	The Hortense-class frigate ran aground off Pointe de Galle, Ceylon and sank. Her crew were rescued.

=== 3 July ===
List of shipwrecks: 3 July 1813
Ship	State	Description
Belvedere	United Kingdom	The ship was driven ashore and wrecked at Saint Thomas. She was on a voyage from Demerara to Liverpool, Lancashire.
Lady Coote	United Kingdom	The ship struck the Black Rock, off Falmouth, Cornwall and was severely damaged. She was on a voyage from Greenock, Renfrewshire to Lisbon, Portugal.

=== 5 July ===
List of shipwrecks: 5 July 1813
Ship	State	Description
Caledonian	United Kingdom	The ship foundered whilst on a voyage from Jamaica to Bristol, Gloucestershire.

=== 10 July ===
List of shipwrecks: 10 July 1813
Ship	State	Description
Ajax	United Kingdom	The ship was driven ashore and damaged near Karlskrona, Sweden.
William	United Kingdom	The ship was driven ashore near Tobermory, Isle of Mull. Her crew were rescued. She was on a voyage from Drogheda, County Louth to a Baltic port. William was later taken in to Oban, Argyllshire.

=== 16 July ===
List of shipwrecks: 16 July 1813
Ship	State	Description
Jane	United Kingdom	War of 1812: The ship was captured and scuttled off the east coast of Jamaica by an American privateer.

=== 18 July ===
List of shipwrecks: 18 July 1813
Ship	State	Description
Chance	United Kingdom	The sloop capsized at Port Royal, Jamaica during a squall.
Jane	United Kingdom	War of 1812: The ship was captured east of Jamaica by an American privateer. She was set afire and sunk. Jane was on a voyage from Barbados to Jamaica.

=== 19 July ===
List of shipwrecks: 19 July 1813
Ship	State	Description
Mary	United Kingdom	The ship was destroyed by fire in the Tagus.

=== 21 July ===
List of shipwrecks: 21 July 1813
Ship	State	Description
Lancaster	United Kingdom	The ship was driven ashore and wrecked at Havana, Cuba.

=== 22 July ===
List of shipwrecks: 22 July 1813
Ship	State	Description
Carlotta	Spain	The ship ran aground on the Carysfort Reef. She was later refloated and arrived at Nassau, Bahamas on 29 July. Carlotta was on a voyage from Havana, Cuba to Liverpool, Lancashire, United Kingdom.

=== 23 July ===
List of shipwrecks: 23 July 1813
Ship	State	Description
Barbadoes	United Kingdom	The ship was wrecked in a hurricane at Martinique.
Bootle	United Kingdom	The ship was wrecked in a hurricane at Bridgetown, Barbados.
Chance	(United Kingdom of Great Britain and Ireland) Anguilla	The sloop was wrecked on a reef off Barbados.
Colonist	United Kingdom	The ship was driven ashore in a hurricane at Bridgetown. Her crew were rescued by Three Sisters (United Kingdom). Colonist was on a voyage from Barbados to London. Colonist was subsequently repaired and returned to service.
Cossack	(United Kingdom of Great Britain and Ireland) Antigua	The ship was wrecked in a hurricane at Guadeloupe. She was on a voyage from Grenada to Marigalante and London.
Dispatch	United Kingdom	The ship was wrecked in a hurricane at Martinique.
Emelia	United Kingdom	The ship was wrecked in a hurricane at Martinique with the loss of fifteen of her crew.
Experiment	United Kingdom	The ship was wrecked in a hurricane at Point Petre, Guadaloupe.
Fanny	United Kingdom	The ship was driven ashore in a hurricane at Martinique. She was later refloated and joined a convoy departing from Saint Thomas for the United Kingdom on 1 August.
John and William	(United Kingdom of Great Britain and Ireland) Guernsey	The ship was wrecked in a hurricane at Saint Kitts.
Lady Spencer	United Kingdom	The mail boat was driven ashore and wrecked in a hurricane at Bridgetown.
Ram	{{{flag}}}	The tender, a schooner, foundered off Barbadoes with the loss of all hands.
Severn	United Kingdom	The ship was driven ashore on Saint Vincent. She was consequently condemned.
Sprightly	United Kingdom	The mail boat was driven ashore and wrecked in a hurricane at Bridgetown.
Teazer	United Kingdom	The armed schooner was driven ashore in a hurricane at Bridgetown.
Watt	United Kingdom	The ship was wrecked in a hurricane at Saint-Pierre, Martinique with the loss of all thirteen crew.
Two unnamed vessels	United Kingdom	The prison ships were driven ashore in a hurricane at Bridgetown.
Two unnamed vessels	Flags unknown	The schooners were driven ashore in a hurricane at Bridgetown.
Unnamed	(United Kingdom of Great Britain and Ireland) Barbados	The shallop was lost at Speightstown.
10 unnamed vessels	United States	The ships were wrecked in a hurricane at St. Kitts.
Three unnamed vessels	(United Kingdom of Great Britain and Ireland) St. Kitts	The schooners were wrecked in a hurricane at St. Kitts.

=== 24 July ===
List of shipwrecks: 24 July 1813
Ship	State	Description
Catalina	United Kingdom	The ship was wrecked on White Cay, off Trinidad, Cuba. Her crew were rescued. She was on a voyage from "St Andreas" to Jamaica.

=== 25 July ===
List of shipwrecks: 25 July 1813
Ship	State	Description
Hinchinbrook	United Kingdom	The packet ship was wrecked on Watland Island, Bahamas with the loss of a crew member. She was on a voyage from Jamaica to London.
Hotspur	United Kingdom	The ship was wrecked on the Atwood Cay. Her crew were rescued. She was on a voyage from St. Domingue to London.

=== 26 July ===
List of shipwrecks: 26 July 1813
Ship	State	Description
Cora	United Kingdom	The ship was driven ashore at Nassau, Bahamas during a hurricane.
Dart	United Kingdom	The ship was lost near Nassau during a hurricane. She was on a voyage from Jamaica to Nassau.
Rocio	Portugal	The ship was wrecked on Pope's Head. She was on a voyage from Lisbon to North Carolina, United States.

=== 27 July ===
List of shipwrecks: 27 July 1813
Ship	State	Description
Henry	United States	The whaler capsized. Five survivors were rescued on 12 September by Hoffnung (United Kingdom). Henry was on a voyage from the South Seas to Nantucket, Massachusetts.
Whitby	United Kingdom	War of 1812: The ship was captured and burnt by USS Argus (United States Navy). She was on a voyage from Gibraltar to Portsmouth, Hampshire.

=== 29 July ===
List of shipwrecks: 29 July 1813
Ship	State	Description
Alert	United Kingdom	War of 1812: The ship was captured and burnt in the Norwegian Sea by USS President (United States Navy). She was on a voyage from Arkhangelsk, Russia to Lisbon, Portugal
Just	United Kingdom	The ship struck a rock at St. Mary's, Isles of Scilly and sank.

=== 31 July ===
List of shipwrecks: 31 July 1813
Ship	State	Description
Elizabeth	United Kingdom	The ship was wrecked in Whitesand Bay. Her crew were rescued. She was on a voyage from a Welsh port to Truro, Cornwall.
Nancy	United Kingdom	The sloop was driven ashore on Jamaica during a hurricane.

=== Unknown date ===
List of shipwrecks: Unknown date in July 1813
Ship	State	Description
Atrevido	Portugal	The ship was lost near Porto.
Brothers	United Kingdom	War of 1812: The ship was captured by an American privateer. She was run ashore on the Spanish coast. Brothers was on a voyage from Newfoundland, British North America to Gibraltar.
Brothers	United Kingdom	War of 1812: The schooner was captured by the privateer Decator (United States) between 19 and 22 July whilst on a voyage from Demerara to Barbados She was set afire and sunk.
HMS Herring	Royal Navy	The Ballahoo-class schooner foundered off Halifax, Nova Scotia, British North America with the loss of all 20 crew.
Jane	United Kingdom	War of 1812: The brig was captured and destroyed east of Jamaica by the privateer Lady Cordelia (United States).
Johanna	United Kingdom	The ship was driven ashore on Rügen, Prussia.
Lion	United Kingdom	The privateer was wrecked between Pernambuco and Bahia, Brazil. Her crew were rescued.
Salamanca	United Kingdom	The ship was captured and burnt by USS Argus (United States Navy) before 24 July. She was on a voyage from Porto to Newfoundland, British North America.
Severn	United Kingdom	The ship was driven ashore and wrecked on Saint Vincent. She was on a voyage from Saint Vincent to Bristol, Gloucestershire.

== August ==
=== 1 August ===
List of shipwrecks: 1 August 1813
Ship	State	Description
Abeona	(United Kingdom of Great Britain and Ireland) Jamaica	The cutter was driven ashore at Kingston during a gale and earthquake.
Alexander	(United Kingdom of Great Britain and Ireland) Jamaica	The schooner sank at Kingston, Jamaica during a gale and earthquake.
Alexander	(United States) Missouri Territory	The schooner was driven ashore and wrecked at Kingston during a gale and earthquake.
Alert	(United Kingdom of Great Britain and Ireland) Jamaica	The sloop was driven ashore and wrecked at Kingston during a gale and earthquake.
Anna	(United Kingdom of Great Britain and Ireland) Jamaica	The sloop was driven ashore and wrecked at Kingston during a gale and earthquake.
Bachelor	(United Kingdom of Great Britain and Ireland) Jamaica	The sloop was driven ashore and wrecked at Rocky Point, Jamaica during a gale and earthquake.
Bee	(United Kingdom of Great Britain and Ireland) Jamaica	The sloop was driven ashore and wrecked at Hanover Street, Jamaica during a gale and earthquake.
Brother and Sister	(United Kingdom of Great Britain and Ireland) Jamaica	The wherry was driven ashore and wrecked at Port Royal, Jamaica during a gale and earthquake.
Clarendon	(United Kingdom of Great Britain and Ireland) Jamaica	The sloop was driven ashore and wrecked at Mosquito Point, Jamaica during a gale and earthquake.
Dart	(United Kingdom of Great Britain and Ireland) Jamaica	The sloop was driven ashore at Kingston during a gale and earthquake.
Dasher	(United Kingdom of Great Britain and Ireland) Jamaica	The sloop was driven ashore at Port Royal during a gale and earthquake.
Dick	(United Kingdom of Great Britain and Ireland) Jamaica	The schooner was driven ashore and wrecked at Rocky Point during a gale and earthquake with the loss of a crew member.
Earl Howe	British East India Company	The East Indiaman was wrecked on the James and Mary's Sand, in the Bengal River. Her crew were rescued.
Eliza	(United Kingdom of Great Britain and Ireland) Jamaica	The schooner was wrecked at Kingston during a gale and earthquake.
Endeavour	(United Kingdom of Great Britain and Ireland) Jamaica	The schooner sank at Kingston during a gale and earthquake.
Enterprize	(United Kingdom of Great Britain and Ireland) Jamaica	The schooner was driven in to the schooner Flora (United Kingdom during a gale and earthquake and sank at Greenwich, Jamaica. Her crew survived.
Flora	United Kingdom	The schooner was severely damaged at Kingston during a gale and earthquake.
Fowey	United Kingdom	War of 1812: The ship was captured by an American privateer at the mouth of the River Shannon. She was set afire and came ashore in Kilbala Bay the next day. Fowey was on a voyage from Limerick to Plymouth, Devon.
Havannah	(United Kingdom of Great Britain and Ireland) Jamaica	The full-rigged ship was driven ashore and wrecked at Kingston during a gale and earthquake.
Jane	(United Kingdom of Great Britain and Ireland) Jamaica	The brigantine sank at Kingston during a gale and earthquake.
Jane	(United Kingdom of Great Britain and Ireland) Jamaica	The schooner was driven ashore and wrecked at Mosquito Point during a gale and earthquake.
Le Veloz	(United Kingdom of Great Britain and Ireland) Jamaica	The schooner was driven into Santa Clara (Spain) during a gale and earthquake and sank at Port Royal.
Llandovery Packet	(United Kingdom of Great Britain and Ireland) Jamaica	The sloop was driven ashore and wrecked at Kingston during a gale and earthquake.
Lovely Lass	(United Kingdom of Great Britain and Ireland) Jamaica	The sloop sank at Kingston during a gale and earthquake.
Mary	(United Kingdom of Great Britain and Ireland) Jamaica	The ship sank at Kingston during a gale and earthquake.
Mary	(United Kingdom of Great Britain and Ireland) Jamaica	The schooner capsized at Kingston during a gale and earthquake.
Minorca	(United Kingdom of Great Britain and Ireland) Jamaica	The schooner sank off Kingston during a gale and earthquake.
Only Daughter	(United Kingdom of Great Britain and Ireland) Jamaica	The sloop was driven ashore and wrecked at Kingston during a gale and earthquake.
Patty	(United Kingdom of Great Britain and Ireland) Jamaica	The schooner capsized and sank at Kingston during a gale and earthquake.
Patty	(United Kingdom of Great Britain and Ireland) Jamaica	The sloop was driven ashore at Moraunt Bay, Jamaica during a gale and earthquake and was wrecked.
Phœnix	(United Kingdom of Great Britain and Ireland) Jamaica	The sloop was driven ashore and wrecked at Kingston during a gale and earthquake.
Planter	(United Kingdom of Great Britain and Ireland) Jamaica	The sloop was driven ashore and wrecked in The Narrows during a gale and earthquake.
San Antonio	(United Kingdom of Great Britain and Ireland) Jamaica	The sloop was driven out to sea from Kingston during a gale and earthquake with two crew on board.
Santa Clara	Spain	The brig was driven into the schooner Le Veloz (Spain) and then came ashore and was wrecked during a gale and earthquake at Port Royal.
Sa Veloz	Flag unknown	The schooner collided with a brig and sank at Port Royal during a gale and earthquake with the loss of all hands.
Simon Taylor	(United Kingdom of Great Britain and Ireland) Jamaica	The sloop was driven ashore and wrecked at Kingston during a gale and earthquake.
Sir Eyre Coote	(United Kingdom of Great Britain and Ireland) Jamaica	The schooner was driven ashored at Healthshire Point, Jamaica during a gale and earthquake. She was on a voyage from Alligator Pond to Port Royal.
Sisters	(United Kingdom of Great Britain and Ireland) Jamaica	The schooner was run down and sunk by Havannah ( (United Kingdom of Great Britain and Ireland) Jamaica) at Kingston during a gale and earthquake.
Swift	(United Kingdom of Great Britain and Ireland) Jamaica	The schooner was driven ashore and wrecked at Kingston during a gale and earthquake.
Tamer	(United Kingdom of Great Britain and Ireland) Jamaica	The schooner was driven ashore and wrecked at Rocky Point during a gale and earthquake.
Tickler	(United Kingdom of Great Britain and Ireland) Jamaica	The schooner was driven ashore in The Narrows during a gale and earthquake.
Two Sisters	(United Kingdom of Great Britain and Ireland) Jamaica	The sloop sank at Kingston during a gale and earthquake.
William	United States	The schooner was driven ashore and wrecked at Kingston during a gale and earthquake.
William	(United Kingdom of Great Britain and Ireland) Jamaica	The brig was driven ashore and wrecked at Kingston during a gale and earthquake.
Unnamed	(United Kingdom of Great Britain and Ireland) Jamaica	The flat sank off Kingston during a gale and earthquake with the loss of four of the seven people on board.
Two unnamed vessels	(Spain) Captaincy General of Puerto Rico	The schooners were driven ashore at Kingston during a gale and earthquake.
Two unnamed vessels	Spain	A schooner and a sloop sank at Kingston during a gale and earthquake.
Unnamed	Flag unknown	The schooner was driven ashore at Port Royal during a gale and earthquake.
Unnamed	Royal Navy	The watering tank was driven ashore in Green Bay, Jamaica during a gale and hurricane.
Unnamed	Spain	The schooner was lost off Little Plump Point, Jamaica during a gale and earthquake.
Four unnamed vessels	(United Kingdom of Great Britain and Ireland) Jamaica	The wherries were driven ashore and wrecked on Jamaica during a gale and earthquake.
Unnamed	(United Kingdom of Great Britain and Ireland) Jamaica	The pilot boat, a schooner, was driven ashore on Rocky Point during a gale and earthquake.
Two unnamed vessels	Spain	The schooners were driven ashore on Rocky Point during a gale and earthquake. The captain of one of them was drowned.
Two unnamed vessels	Flags unknown	The ships were driven ashore on Rocky Point during a gale and earthquake.

=== 2 August ===
List of shipwrecks: 2 August 1813
Ship	State	Description
Rodney	United Kingdom	The ship was driven ashore on the coast of British Honduras. She was still aground on 11 September.

=== 4 August ===
List of shipwrecks: 4 August 1813
Ship	State	Description
Ahros	United Kingdom	The schooner was driven ashore on Bermuda during a hurricane.
Alliance	United Kingdom	The schooner was driven ashore and wrecked on Bermuda during a hurricane.
HMS Barbadoes	Royal Navy	The sloop-of-war was driven ashore on Bermuda during a hurricane. She was later refloated.
Bermuda	United Kingdom	The ship capsized at Bermuda during a hurricane.
Catharine	United Kingdom	The schooner was driven ashore and wrecked on Bermuda during a hurricane.
Catharine Anna	(United Kingdom of Great Britain and Ireland) Jamaica	The schooner was driven ashore and wrecked on Bermuda during a hurricane.
Cornelia	United Kingdom	The brig was driven ashore on Bermuda and sank during a hurricane.
Cyrus	United Kingdom	The full-rigged ship was driven ashore on Bermuda during a hurricane. She was later refloated.
Dolphin	United Kingdom	The stores ship was driven ashore on Bermuda during a hurricane. She was later refloated.
Dolphin	United Kingdom	The schooner was driven ashore and wrecked on Bermuda during a hurricane.
Earl Howe	British East Indian Company	The ship was wrecked on the James and Mary Sands, in the Bengal River. She was on a voyage from Bengal, India to London.
Effort	United Kingdom	The full-rigged ship was driven ashore on Bermuda during a hurricane.
Elizabeth	United Kingdom	The full-rigged ship was driven ashore on Bermuda during a hurricane.
Favourite	United Kingdom	The ship caught fire in The Downs and was beached on the Sandwich Flats, but was destroyed. She was on a voyage from London to Guadeloupe.
General Knox	United Kingdom	The full-rigged ship was driven ashore and severely damaged on Bermuda during a hurricane.
Georgina	United Kingdom	The full-rigged ship was driven ashore on Bermuda during a hurricane.
General Doyle	United Kingdom	The cutter was driven ashore and wrecked on Bermuda during a hurricane.
General Mondeverde	United Kingdom	The schooner was driven ashore on Bermuda during a hurricane.
General Wale	United Kingdom	The schooner was driven ashore and wrecked on Bermuda during a hurricane.
Gerona	Spain	The full-rigged ship was driven ashore on Bermuda during a hurricane. She was later refloated.
Gorypurm	United Kingdom	The full-rigged ship was driven ashore on Bermuda during a hurricane.
Governor Strong	United Kingdom	The full-rigged ship was driven ashore on Bermuda during a hurricane. She was later refloated.
Hannah	United Kingdom	The brig was driven ashore and wrecked on Bermuda during a hurricane.
Hero	United Kingdom	The ssloop was driven ashore on Bermuda during a hurricane.
Indian	United Kingdom	The full-rigged ship was driven ashore and severely damaged on Bermuda during a hurricane. She was later refloated.
Leander	United Kingdom	The full-rigged ship was driven ashore on Bermuda during a hurricane.
Lillea	United Kingdom	The schooner was driven ashore on Bermuda during a hurricane.
Malvina	United Kingdom	The brig was driven ashore and wrecked in a hurricane at Bermuda. She was on a voyage from Saint Martin to Greenock, Renfrewshire.
Nautilus	United Kingdom	The schooner was driven ashore on Bermuda during a hurricane.
Noticia Felix	Portugal	The sbrig was driven ashore and wrecked on Bermuda during a hurricane.
Pekin	United Kingdom	The full-rigged ship was driven ashore on Bermuda during a hurricane.
Prince of Wales	United Kingdom	The transport ship was driven ashore on Bermuda during a hurricane.
Prince Regent	Portugal	The brig was driven ashore and wrecked on Bermuda during a hurricane.
Rebecca	United Kingdom	The full-rigged ship was driven ashore on Bermuda during a hurricane.
Rising Sun	United Kingdom	The sloop was driven ashore and wrecked on Bermuda during a hurricane.
Rolla	United Kingdom	The full-rigged ship was driven ashore and wrecked on Bermuda during a hurricane.
Sidney	United Kingdom	The schooner capsized at Bermuda during a hurricane. She was subsequently righted.
Slebeck Hall	United Kingdom	The ship was last sighted on this date whilst on a voyage from Tobago to London. No further trace, presumed foundered with the loss of all hands.
St Jago	United Kingdom	The brig was driven ashore on Bermuda during a hurricane.
St John	United Kingdom	The sloop was driven ashore and wrecked on Bermuda during a hurricane.
Swallow	United Kingdom	The schooner was driven ashore on Bermuda during a hurricane.
Triton	United Kingdom	The brig was driven ashore on Bermuda during a hurricane.
Truth	United Kingdom	The full-rigged ship was driven ashore on Bermuda during a hurricane.
Vesta	United Kingdom	The schooner was driven ashore on Bermuda during a hurricane.
Vine	United Kingdom	The full-rigged ship was driven ashore on Bermuda during a hurricane.

=== 5 August ===
List of shipwrecks: 5 August 1813
Ship	State	Description
William and Mary	United Kingdom	The ship foundered in the English Channel with the loss of both crew members. She was on a voyage from Lymington, Hampshire to Poole, Dorset.
Unanimity	United Kingdom	The ship ran aground on The Manacles. She consequently foundered at Falmouth, Cornwall. She was on a voyage from Newcastle-upon-Tyne, Northumberland to Quebec, British North America.

=== 8 August ===
List of shipwrecks: 8 August 1813
Ship	State	Description
Ann and Mary	United Kingdom	The sloop sprang a leak and foundered off Llanelli, Glamorgan with the loss of one of her three crew.
Gute Hoffnung	United Kingdom	War of 1812: The ship was captured and scuttled by the privateer Frolic (United States). She was on a voyage from Portsmouth, Hampshire to Prince Edward Island, British North America.
USS Hamilton	United States Navy	The schooner foundered off Hamilton, Ontario, British North America in a squall with the loss of 42 of her 50 crew.
USS Scourge	United States Navy	The schooner foundered off Hamilton, Ontario in a squall with the loss of six of her fourteen crew.

=== 9 August ===
List of shipwrecks: 9 August 1813
Ship	State	Description
Alliance	United Kingdom	War of 1812: The ship was captured and burnt by USS Argus (United States Navy). She was on a voyage from Cork to Limerick.
Barbadoes	United Kingdom	War of 1812: The ship was captured and burnt by USS Argus (United States Navy). She was on a voyage from Cork to St Andero, Spain.

=== 11 August ===
List of shipwrecks: 11 August 1813
Ship	State	Description
Mariner	United Kingdom	War of 1812: The ship was captured and burnt by USS Argus (United States Navy). She was on a voyage from Saint Croix to Bristol, Gloucestershire.

=== 12 August ===
List of shipwrecks: 12 August 1813
Ship	State	Description
John & Sally	United Kingdom	War of 1812: The ship was captured and burnt off The Smalls by USS Argus (United States Navy). she was on a voyage from Cork to Ilfracombe, Devon.

=== 13 August ===
List of shipwrecks: 13 August 1813
Ship	State	Description
Kit (Кит, 'Whale')	Imperial Russian Navy	The transport ship was driven ashore and wrecked on the Vistula Spit, 15 versts (16 km (10 mi)) east of Danzig. Her crew were rescued. She was on a voyage from Riga to Danzig.
L'Aigle	United Kingdom	The ship capsized and sank in the West India Docks, London. She was later refloated.

=== 15 August ===
List of shipwrecks: 16 August 1813
Ship	State	Description
Louisa	United Kingdom	War of 1812: The full-rigged ship, which had been captured on 7 August by the privateer Saucy Jack (United States), was burnt when Saucy Jack encountered a frigate and a brig. Louisa had been on a voyage from Cape Francois, Hispaniola to London.

=== 16 August ===
List of shipwrecks: 16 August 1813
Ship	State	Description
Enterprise	Spain Viceroyalty of New Grenada	The privateer, which had been captured by Argo (Royal Navy), was wrecked at Jérémie, Haiti.
Friends	United Kingdom	War of 1812: The ship was captured in the Gulf of St Lawrence by an American privateer whilst on a voyage from Newfoundland to Pictou, Nova Scotia, British North America. She was set afire and sunk.
Louisa	United Kingdom	The ship departed from Jamaica for Bermuda. No further trace, presumed foundered with the loss of all hands.

=== 17 August ===
List of shipwrecks: 17 August 1813
Ship	State	Description
Active	United Kingdom	The ship departed Lisbon, Portugal for Alicante, Spain. No further trace, presumed foundered with the loss of all hands.

=== 23 August ===
List of shipwrecks: 23 August 1813
Ship	State	Description
HMS Colibri	Royal Navy	The brig ran aground on a sandbank off the coast of South Carolina, United States and capsized. Her crew were rescued by HMS Moselle (Royal Navy). She was destroyed in a hurricane on 27 August.
Itam	United Kingdom	The schooner foundered in the West Indies with some loss of life.
Samuel Cumming	United Kingdom	War of 1812: The ship, which had been captured by the privateer Pike (United States), foundered off Charleston, South Carolina, United States. She had been on a voyage from Trinidad de Cuba to Liverpool, Lancashire.

=== 25 August ===
List of shipwrecks: 25 August 1813
Ship	State	Description
Philip	United Kingdom	The brig sprang a leak and was beached on Bermuda.

=== 26 August ===
List of shipwrecks: 26 August 1813
Ship	State	Description
Conck	United Kingdom	The ship was wrecked on Eleuthera. She was on a voyage from Nassau, Bahamas to Jamaica.
Fair Bahamian	United Kingdom	The ship was wrecked on Cat Key. She was on a voyage from Havana, Cuba to the United Kingdom.

=== 28 August ===
List of shipwrecks: 28 August 1813
Ship	State	Description
Catalina	United States	The brig was wrecked off Nassau, Bahamas. Her crew were rescued.
Governor Kinderland	United States	The ship was wrecked off Nassau. Her crew were rescued. She was on a voyage from Pensacola, Florida to Nassau.
Louisa	Spain Bahamas	The ship was wrecked off Nassau. Her crew were rescued. She was on a voyage from Nassau to Havana, Cuba.
Maria Francesca	Spain	The ship was wrecked off Nassau. Her crew were rescued.
San Guillermo	Spain	The ship was wrecked off Nassau. Her crew were rescued. She was on a voyage from Nassau to Havana.

=== 30 August ===
List of shipwrecks: 30 August 1813
Ship	State	Description
Howard	United Kingdom	War of the Sixth Coalition: The ship was captured in the Atlantic Ocean off Cape Finisterre, Spain by the privateer Lion (France). She was set afire and sunk. Howard was on a voyage from London to St. Andero, Spain.

=== Unknown date ===
List of shipwrecks: Unknown date in August 1813
Ship	State	Description
Alexander	United Kingdom	The transport ship was driven ashore near Rostock in late August.
Baltic	United Kingdom	War of 1812: The ship was captured and burnt by USS Argus (United States Navy). She was on a voyage from Barbados to Dublin.
Belford	United Kingdom	War of 1812: The ship was captured and burnt by USS Argus (United States Navy). She was on a voyage from Dublin to London.
Defiance	United Kingdom	War of 1812: The ship was captured and burnt by USS Argus (United States Navy). She was on a voyage from Glasgow, Renfrewshire to Newfoundland, British North America.
Dinas & Betty	United Kingdom	War of 1812: The ship was captured and burnt by USS Argus (United States Navy). She was on a voyage from Cork to Ilfracombe, Devon.
Estrella del Sur	Portugal	The ship was wrecked on the Irish coast at Popes Head. She was on a voyage from Montevideo to London, United Kingdom.
Fleece	United Kingdom	The ship ran aground in the Humber. She was on a voyage from Selby, Yorkshire to London. She was refloated and taken in to Hull, Yorkshire in a severely leaky condition.
Floyd	United Kingdom	War of 1812: The ship was captured and burnt by USS Saratoga (United States Navy). She was on a voyage from Gorey, Bouches-de-l'Escaut, France to Tenerife, Canary Islands.
Lady Frances	United Kingdom	War of 1812: The ship was captured and burnt by USS Argus (United States Navy). She was on a voyage from Limerick to Liverpool.
Maria	United Kingdom	The ship was lost in the Formby Channel. She was on a voyage from Liverpool to Cádiz, Spain.
Philip	United Kingdom	The brig sprang a leak off Bermuda on or about 25 August and was beached.
Robert and Sally	United Kingdom	War of the Sixth Coalition: The fishing boat was captured off Cape La Hogue, Manche, France and was taken in to Cherbourg. She was liberated, but foundered in the English Channel whilst returning to Poole, Dorset.
Providence	United Kingdom	The transport ship was driven ashore near Colberg in late August.
St. Ann	Sweden	The ship ran aground on the Sandhammer in mid-August. She was on a voyage from Stockholm to Gothenburg.

== September ==
=== 1 September ===
List of shipwrecks: 1 September 1813
Ship	State	Description
William Miles	United Kingdom	The ship sank at Bristol, Gloucestershire. She was refloated on 8 October.

=== 2 September ===
List of shipwrecks: 2 September 1813
Ship	State	Description
No. 21	Imperial Russian Navy	The ship ran aground and was wrecked on the Stapel-botten Bank northwest of Vormsi, and was subsequently carried off to sea. She was on a voyage from Riga to Danzig, but had changed course to Reval.

=== 3 September ===
List of shipwrecks: 3 September 1813
Ship	State	Description
Apollo	United Kingdom	The ship was wrecked at South Bull Head, Drogheda, County Louth.

=== 5 September ===
List of shipwrecks: 5 September 1813
Ship	State	Description
Maria Theresa	Spain	The ship was at Portsmouth, Hampshire, United Kingdom whilst on a voyage from A Coruña to London, United Kingdom. No further trace, presumed foundered.
Robert & Ann	United Kingdom	The transport ship was driven ashore at St. Andero, Spain. She was refloated don 10 September.

=== 6 September ===
List of shipwrecks: 6 September 1813
Ship	State	Description
Betsey	United Kingdom	The ship was driven ashore near Ramsgate, Kent. She was on a voyage from St. Ubes, Portugal to a Baltic port. Betsey was refloated the next day.

=== 7 September ===
List of shipwrecks: 7 September 1813
Ship	State	Description
Culloden	United Kingdom	The sloop foundered in the North Sea off Boddam, Aberdeenshire with the loss of all on board, at least four lives.
Grace	United Kingdom	The ship was driven ashore and wrecked at Aberystwyth, Carmarthenshire. She was on a voyage from Liverpool, Lancashire to Waterford.
Piedade	Portugal	The ship was driven ashore and wrecked at Aberystwyth. She was on a voyage from Maranhão, Brazil to Liverpool.

=== 8 September ===
List of shipwrecks: 8 September 1813
Ship	State	Description
Anne & Sarah	United Kingdom	The sloop sprang a leak in Rhossili Bay and sank with the loss of one of her three crew.
Maria	United Kingdom	The ship was driven ashore at Gothenburg, Sweden.

=== 9 September ===
List of shipwrecks: 9 September 1813
Ship	State	Description
HMS Alphea	Royal Navy	War of the Sixth Coalition: The Adonis-class schooner was sunk in the English Channel south west of Start Point, Devon in an engagement with the cutter Renard (France). All 35 crew were killed.
Dolphin	United States	The ship capsized in the Mediterranean Sea. Her crew were rescued. She was on a voyage from Naples, Kingdom of Sicily to New York.

=== 11 September ===
List of shipwrecks: 11 September 1813
Ship	State	Description
Vine	United Kingdom	The ship was driven ashore and wrecked on Barbuda.
HMS Woolwich	Royal Navy	The transport ship, an Adventure-class ship, was driven ashore and wrecked on Barbuda. Her crew were rescued.

=== 13 September ===
List of shipwrecks: 13 September 1813
Ship	State	Description
Fortune	United Kingdom	The ship departed from New South Wales for China. No further trace, presumed foundered with the loss of all hands.
Lady Rollo	United Kingdom	The ship grounded on a shoal 40 miles SSE from Flores Head. The crew were unable to get her off and she bilged and was lost. The crew took to her boats and survived.

=== 14 September ===
List of shipwrecks: 14 September 1813
Ship	State	Description
Roscius	United Kingdom	The ship ran aground on the Absollia. She was refloated and taken in to "Caravalhos", Brazil.

=== 15 September ===
List of shipwrecks: 15 September 1813
Ship	State	Description
Happy Return	United Kingdom	The collier was destroyed by fire near Penzance, Cornwall. She was on a voyage from Gweek, Cornwall to Cork and Spain.

=== 16 September ===
List of shipwrecks: 16 September 1813
Ship	State	Description
USS Gunboat No. 164	United States Navy	The "Jefferson Gunboat" sank at St. Mary's, Georgia in a squall. 20 crew killed.

=== 17 September ===
List of shipwrecks: 17 September 1813
Ship	State	Description
Flor de Guadiana	Spain	The ship was driven ashore on Amelia Island, East Florida, New Spain and was wrecked.

=== 19 September ===
List of shipwrecks: 19 September 1813
Ship	State	Description
Favourite	United Kingdom	The ship ran aground on a reef and was wrecked. Her crew were rescued. She was on a voyage from British Honduras to London.

=== 20 September ===
List of shipwrecks: 20 September 1813
Ship	State	Description
Loyalty	United Kingdom	The ship struck a rock and sank at Portaferry, County Down. Her crew were rescued.
Reliance	United Kingdom	The ship foundered in the Atlantic Ocean off the Saltee Islands, County Donegal. She was on a voyage from Swansea, Glamorgan to Donegal.

=== 21 September ===
List of shipwrecks: 21 September 1813
Ship	State	Description
Vrow Cornelia	Flag unknown	The ship departed from London, United Kingdom for Reval, Russia. No further trace, presumed foundered with the loss of all hands.

=== 22 September ===
List of shipwrecks: 22 September 1813
Ship	State	Description
Harriet	United Kingdom	The transport ship was driven ashore and wrecked at Aldeburgh, Suffolk.

=== 26 September ===
List of shipwrecks: 26 September 1813
Ship	State	Description
Dasher	United Kingdom	The ship capsized at Falmouth, Cornwall. She was on a voyage from Cork to Padstow and Falmouth.
Forester	United Kingdom	The ship was wrecked in the Turks Islands. Her crew were rescued. She was on a voyage from Bermuda to Jamaica.

=== 27 September ===
List of shipwrecks: 27 September 1813
Ship	State	Description
Boa Esperanza	Portugal	War of the Sixth Coalition: The ship was captured and sunk by the privateer Lion (France). She was on a voyage from St. Ubes to Galicia, Spain.
HMS Bold	Royal Navy	The Bold-class gun-brig ran aground on Prince Edward Island, British North America and was wrecked. All 67 crew were rescued.
Naiad	United Kingdom	The ship ran aground on the Haisborough Sands, in the North Sea off the coast of Norfolk. She was refloated but was consequently beached at Horsey, Norfolk. She was on a voyage from Sunderland, County Durham to London.

=== Unknown date ===
List of shipwrecks: Unknown date in September 1813
Ship	State	Description
Adventure	United Kingdom	The ship struck the Menister Rock and sank off Scarboro', Lower Canada, British North America. She was on a voyage from Newfoundland, British North America to Tobago.
Catherine & Caroline	United Kingdom	The ship sprang a leak and was beached at St. Andero, Spain. She was on a voyage from Lisbon, Portugal to St. Andero. Catherine & Caroline was later refloated and repaired.
Franics Ann	United Kingdom	The ship was driven ashore and sank near Port Glasgow, Renfrewshire.
John & Eleanor	United Kingdom	The ship sprang a leak and foundered in the North Sea. Her crew were rescued by Burstroe (Imperial Russian Navy). John & Eleanor was on a voyage from Heligoland to Hull, Yorkshire.
Miners	United Kingdom	The ship was lost with all hands. She was on a voyage from Cornwall to Aberavon, Glamorgan.

== October ==
=== 1 October ===
List of shipwrecks: 1 October 1813
Ship	State	Description
Alexander	Russia	War of the Sixth Coalition: The ship was captured by Travers and Weser (both French Navy) whilst on a voyage from Arkhangelsk to London, United Kingdom. She was set afire and sunk.
Corunna Packet	United Kingdom	The ship departed from Portsmouth, Hampshire for A Coruña, Spain. No further trace.

=== 2 October ===
List of shipwrecks: 2 October 1813
Ship	State	Description
Sophia Elizabeth	Sweden	War of the Sixth Coalition: The ship was captured by Travers and Weser (both French Navy) whilst on a voyage from Boston, Massachusetts, United States to Gothenburg. She was set afire and sunk.

=== 3 October ===
List of shipwrecks: 3 October 1813
Ship	State	Description
Frau Korneliya (Фрау Корнелия)	Imperial Russian Navy	The transport ship ran aground off Närsholmen, Gotland, Sweden and was wrecked. Her crew were rescued. She was on a voyage from Danzig to Sveaborg, Grand Duchy of Finland.

=== 4 October ===
List of shipwrecks: 4 October 1813
Ship	State	Description
Collins	United Kingdom	The ship was wrecked near Gävle, Sweden. Her crew were rescued.
Frau Margaretha	Heligoland	The ship was driven ashore on Heligoland.
Jonge Margaretha	Heligoland	The ship was driven ashore on Heligoland.
Jonge Paul	Heligoland	The ship was driven ashore on Heligoland.
Rendeberg	Heligoland	The ship was driven ashore on Heligoland.

=== 6 October ===
List of shipwrecks: 6 October 1813
Ship	State	Description
Minerva	Portugal	War of the Sixth Coalition: The schooner was captured 20 leagues (60 nautical miles [110 km]) off Cabo da Roca by the privateer Lion (France and was destroyed. Minerva was on a voyage from São Miguel Island, Azores to Lisbon.

=== 7 October ===
List of shipwrecks: 7 October 1813
Ship	State	Description
Frau Margaretha	Heligoland	The ship was driven ashore on Heligoland.
Jonge Margaretha	Heligoland	The ship was driven ashore on Heligoland.
Jonge Paul	Heligoland	The ship was driven ashore on Heligoland.
Rendeburg	Heligoland	The ship was driven ashore on Heligoland.

=== 8 October ===
List of shipwrecks: 8 October 1813
Ship	State	Description
Caridade	Portugal	War of the Sixth Coalition: The brig was captured off the coast of Portugal by the privateer Lion (France) and was destroyed. Caridade was on a voyage from Lisbon to the Brazils.
Nancy	United Kingdom	The ship was wrecked at Havana, Cuba.

=== 9 October ===
List of shipwrecks: 9 October 1813
Ship	State	Description
Ceres	United Kingdom	The transport ship was lost near Passage West, County Cork.
Colworth	United Kingdom	The transport ship was lost near Passage West.

=== 10 October ===
List of shipwrecks: 10 October 1813
Ship	State	Description
Ann	United Kingdom	The ship was run ashore near Pillau, Prussia, where she was wrecked on 12 October. She was on a voyage from Pillau to an English port.
Grace	United Kingdom	The ship, having sprung a leak two days before, was set afire and abandoned in the Atlantic Ocean. Her crew were rescued by HMS Andromache (Royal Navy). She was on a voyage from London to Lisbon, Portugal.

=== 11 October ===
List of shipwrecks: 11 October 1813
Ship	State	Description
Sir James Yeo	United Kingdom	The ship was lost whilst on a voyage from New Brunswick to Newfoundland, British North America.
Unnamed	Sweden	War of the Sixth Coalition: The galiot was captured off the coast of Portugal by the privateer Lion (France) and was destroyed.

=== 12 October ===
List of shipwrecks: 12 October 1813
Ship	State	Description
St Andreas	Sweden	War of the Sixth Coalition: The ship was captured and burnt by the privateer Lion (France).

=== 13 October ===
List of shipwrecks: 13 October 1813
Ship	State	Description
Annetta	United Kingdom	The ship was wrecked near Gothenburg, Sweden. Her crew were rescued. She was on a voyage from Lisbon, Portugal to a Baltic port.
Flibustier	French Navy	War of the Sixth Coalition: The corvette was set afire and abandoned by her crew off the mouth of the Adour following and engagement with HMS Telegraph (Royal Navy).
Iris	United Kingdom	The ship foundered in the North Sea off the Dudgeon Lightship ( Trinity House). She was on a voyage from Burnham Overy Staithe, Norfolk to Leeds, Yorkshire.
Sedulous	United Kingdom	The ship was wrecked on Scroby Sands, Norfolk. Her crew were rescued. She was on a voyage from Newcastle upon Tyne, Northumberland to London.

=== 14 October ===
List of shipwrecks: 14 October 1813
Ship	State	Description
Alexander	United Kingdom	The ship was driven ashore and wrecked at Gothenburg, Sweden. She was on a voyage from Narva, Russia to London.
Amizade	Portugal	The ship was driven ashore at Gothenburg. She was on a voyage from Lisbon to Saint Petersburg, Russia.
Ann	United Kingdom	The ship was driven ashore at Gothenburg.
Anna Elizabeth	United Kingdom	The ship was driven ashore near Gothenburg. She was on a voyage from Saint Petersburg to London.
Aurora	Spain	The ship was driven ashore at Gothenburg. She was on a voyage from Riga, Russia to Vigo.
Bell	United Kingdom	The ship was driven ashore at Gothenburg. She was on a voyage from Pillau, Prussia to London.
Calypso	(United Kingdom of Great Britain and Ireland) Guernsey	The ship was driven ashore and wrecked at Gothenburg. She was on a voyage from Saint Petersburg, Russia to Guernsey, Channel Islands.
Carolina	United Kingdom	The ship was driven ashore at Gothenburg. She was on a voyage from Saint Petersburg to London. Carolina was refloated on 17 October and taken in to Gothenburg.
Daniel	Russia	The ship was driven ashore at Gothenburg. She was on a voyage from London to Saint Petersburg.
Dorothea	United Kingdom	The ship was driven ashore at Marstrand, Sweden. She was on a voyage from Leith, Lothian to a Baltic port.
Fanny	United Kingdom	The ship was driven ashore at Gothenburg. She was on a voyage from Gothernburg to Londonderry. Fanny was later refloated and repaired.
Friends	United Kingdom	The ship was driven ashore at Gothenburg. She was on a voyage from Saint Petersburg to London.
Grafoe	Sweden	The ship was lost near Marstrand with the loss of five of her crew. She was on a voyage from St. Ubes, Portugal to Gothenburg.
Goodwill	United Kingdom	The ship was driven ashore at Gothenburg. She was on a voyage from Kalmar, Sweden to an English port.
Gustaff Adolph	Sweden	The ship was driven ashore at Gothenburg. She was on a voyage from Gothenburg to Lisbon.
Gute Hoffnung	Heligoland	The ship was driven ashore on Düne.
Hope	United Kingdom	The sloop was driven ashore on Düne.
Leander	United Kingdom	The ship was driven ashore at Gothenburg. She was on a voyage from Königsberg, Prussia to Hull, Yorkshire.
Margaret	United Kingdom	The ship was driven ashore at Gothenburg. She was on a voyage from Riga to Montrose, Forfarshire.
Minerva	United Kingdom	The ship was wrecked at Marstrand, Sweden. She was on a voyage from London to Gothenburg.
Newburgh	United Kingdom	The ship was driven ashore at Gothenburg. She was on a voyage from London to Königsberg.
San Ruso	Spain	The ship was driven ashore and wrecked at Gothenburg. She was on a voyage from Riga to a Spanish port.
Stadt Berlin	Prussia	The ship foundered in the Dogger Bank.
St Johannes	Prussia	The ship was driven ashore at Gothenburg. She was on a voyage from Pillau to London.
Undaunted	United Kingdom	The ship was driven ashore at Gothenburg.
Union	United Kingdom	The ship was driven ashore at Gothenburg. She was on a voyage from Riga to Dundee, Forfarshire.
Woodman	United Kingdom	The transport ship was driven ashore at Gothenburg. She was later refloated.
Unnamed	United Kingdom	War of the Sixth Coalition: The full-rigged ship was captured off the coast of Portugal by the privateer Lion (France) and was destroyed.

=== 15 October ===
List of shipwrecks: 15 October 1813
Ship	State	Description
Abeona	United Kingdom	The ship was wrecked in The Wash off Wainfleet, Lincolnshire with the loss of three lives. She was on a voyage from Sunderland, County Durham to Boston, Lincolnshire.
Plumstead	United Kingdom	War of the Sixth Coalition: The ship was captured by the privateer Lion (France) in the Atlantic Ocean off Cape St. Mary. She was set afire and sunk. Plumstead was on a voyage from Seville, Spain to London.
Restitution	United Kingdom	The ship was driven ashore on Düne. She was on a voyage from Harwich, Essex to Heligoland.
Union	United Kingdom	The ship was driven ashore on Düne.
Unnamed	United Kingdom	War of the Sixth Coalition: The sloop was captured off the coast of Portugal by the privateer Lion (France) and was destroyed.

=== 16 October ===
List of shipwrecks: 16 October 1813
Ship	State	Description
Gustavus	Sweden	The ship was lost near Les Sables-d'Olonne, Vendée. France. She was on a voyage from Bordeaux, Gironde, France to a Swedish port.
True Blue	United Kingdom	The ship was last sighted on this date whilst on a voyage from London to Heligoland. Presumed foundered with the loss of all hands before 19 October.

=== 17 October ===
List of shipwrecks: 17 October 1813
Ship	State	Description
Dædalus	United Kingdom	The ship struck rocks off Inchkeith and foundered in the Firth of Forth. She was on a voyage from Wick, Caithness to a Baltic port. Dædalus was later refloated.

=== 19 October ===
List of shipwrecks: 19 October 1813
Ship	State	Description
Jackall	United Kingdom	War of the Sixth Coalition: The full-rigged ship was captured off the coast of Portugal (34°40′N 9°00′W) by the privateer Lion (France) and was destroyed.
Melantho	United Kingdom	War of the Sixth Coalition: The full-rigged ship was captured off the coast of Portugal (35°40′N 9°00′W) by the privateer Lion (France) and was destroyed.

=== 20 October ===
List of shipwrecks: 20 October 1813
Ship	State	Description
Charming Kitty	United Kingdom	The ship was lost near Bermuda. Her crew were rescued. She was on a voyage from British Honduras to London.
Queen Charlotte	United Kingdom	The ship was in collision with Phœbe (United Kingdom) and foundered off Spithead. She was on a voyage from London to the Cape of Good Hope. Queen Charlotte was raised and beached in early December but broke up in a gale on 10 December.
William	United Kingdom	The ship was wrecked on Dunnagee Point. She was on a voyage from Londonderry to Glasgow, Renfrewshire.

=== 21 October ===
List of shipwrecks: 21 October 1813
Ship	State	Description
Cæsar	United Kingdom	The ship was driven ashore and wrecked at Ballywalter, County Down with the loss of three of her crew. She was on a voyage from Greenock, Renfrewshire to Jamaica.
Catherine	United Kingdom	The ship was driven ashore and wrecked on Heligoland.
Christopher	United Kingdom	The ship was driven ashore and wrecked on Heligoland.
General Burgoyne	United Kingdom	The ship foundered in the Atlantic Ocean off the Saltee Islands, County Wexford. Her crew were rescued. She was on a voyage from Burry Port, Glamorgan to Padstow, Cornwall.
Restitution	United Kingdom	The ship was driven ashore at Heligoland.
St Peter	United Kingdom	The ship was driven ashore on Heligoland. She was refloated and sailed to Hull, Yorkshire.
Unnamed	United Kingdom	The galiot was wrecked at Ballywalter.

=== 22 October ===
List of shipwrecks: 22 October 1813
Ship	State	Description
Elizabeth	(Denmark) Norway	The ship was driven ashore and wrecked at Great Yarmouth, Norfolk, United Kingdom.
James	United Kingdom	War of the Sixth Coalition: The ship was captured and burnt in the North Sea off South Shields, County Durham by two French frigates.
HMS Laurestinus	Royal Navy	The post ship was wrecked in the Abaco Islands. Her crew were rescued.
Mansfield	United Kingdom	The ship ran aground on the Whitton Sand, in the River Humber and was wrecked. She was on a voyage from London to Gainsborough, Lincolnshire.
William	United Kingdom	The ship was driven ashore at Ramsgate, Kent. She was on a voyage from Portland, Dorset to London.

=== 23 October ===
List of shipwrecks: 23 October 1813
Ship	State	Description
Nautilus	United Kingdom	The ship sprang a leak and was beached in Runswick Bay, wheres she was subsequently wrecked.
Nancy	United Kingdom	The sloop was wrecked at Dublin. She was on a voyage from Plymouth, Devon to Liverpool, Lancashire.
Orlando	United Kingdom	The transport ship was driven ashore and wrecked on Anticosti Island, British North America. Her crew were rescued.

=== 24 October ===
List of shipwrecks: 24 October 1813
Ship	State	Description
Unnamed	United Kingdom	The sloop foundered off Merrion, County Dublin. Her crew were rescued. She was on a voyage from Plymouth, Devon to Liverpool, Lancashire.

=== 25 October ===
List of shipwrecks: 25 October 1813
Ship	State	Description
Rose	(United Kingdom of Great Britain and Ireland) Guernsey	The ship was captured and sunk in the Atlantic Ocean (19°50′N 39°40′W) by USS Congress (United States Navy). She was on a voyage from Guernsey to Guadeloupe.

=== 26 October ===
List of shipwrecks: 26 October 1813
Ship	State	Description
Jane	United Kingdom	The transport ship was wrecked on Anticosti Island, British North America. Her crew were rescued.
Mansfield	United Kingdom	The ship was driven ashore on the Whitton Sand, in the Humber and was wrecked. She was on a voyage from London to Gainsborough, Lincolnshire.

=== 27 October ===
List of shipwrecks: 27 October 1813
Ship	State	Description
Active's Increase	United Kingdom	The ship ran aground on the Goodwin Sands, Kent. She was on a voyage from Saint Petersburg, Russia to Plymouth, Devon. Active's Increase was refloated on 1 November and taken in to Ramsgate, Kent.
Ann	United Kingdom	The ship was wrecked at Great Yarmouth, Norfolk.
Basilus	United Kingdom	The ship was driven ashore at Lowestoft, Suffolk.
Louisa	Russia	The hoy was wrecked on the Barber Sand, in the North Sea off Caister-on-Sea, Norfolk, United Kingdom. She was on a voyage from Saint Petersburg to Sheerness, Kent, United Kingdom.

=== 28 October ===
List of shipwrecks: 28 October 1813
Ship	State	Description
Experiment	United Kingdom	War of the Sixth Coalition: The privateer Lion (France) captured the ship in the Atlantic Ocean off the coast of Portugal and sank her. Experiment was on a voyage from Portsmouth, Hampshire to Mahón, Spain.
Mary	United Kingdom	The sloop sank at Whitby, Yorkshire. All on board were rescued by the Whitby Lifeboat. She was later refloated and brought in to Whitby.
Susannah	United Kingdom	The ship was driven ashore near Bideford, Devon. She was on a voyage from Swansea, Glamorgan to London. She was later refloated.
Tre-Madoc	War of the Sixth Coalition: United Kingdom	The ship was captured by two French Navy frigates off The Needles, Isle of Wight whilst on a voyage from Hull, Yorkshire to Sicily. She was set afire and sunk.

=== 30 October ===
List of shipwrecks: 30 October 1813
Ship	State	Description
Apollo	United Kingdom	The ship sank at Whitehaven, Cumberland. She was on a voyage from Liverpool, Lancashire to Dublin.
Lark	United Kingdom	The ship was wrecked on the Isle of Arran. She was on a voyage from Sligo to Greenock, Renfrewshire.
Laura	United Kingdom	War of the Sixth Coalition: The ship was captured by the privateer Lion (France) in the Atlantic Ocean off the coast of Portugal. She was set afire and sunk. Laura was on a voyage from Newfoundland, British North America to Lisbon, Portugal and A Coruña, Spain
Newcastle	United Kingdom	The ship was lost near Gotland, Sweden. She was on a voyage from London to Saint Petersburg, Russia.
Volga	United Kingdom	War of the Sixth Coalition: The transport ship was captured by the privateer Lion (France) in the Atlantic Ocean off the coast of Portugal. She was set afire and sunk.

=== 31 October ===
List of shipwrecks: 31 October 1813
Ship	State	Description
Alexander	Prussia	The galiot was driven ashore at Kilnsea, Yorkshire, United Kingdom. She was on a voyage from Swinemünde to Hull, Yorkshire. She was refloated on 2 November and taken in to Hull.
Daphne	United States	The ship was driven ashore on Sanday, Orkney Islands, United Kingdom. Shew as refloated and taken in to Osterwick.
Jervis	United Kingdom	The ship was wrecked at Gothenburg, Sweden with the loss of all hands. She was on a voyage from Stralsund to Great Yarmouth, Norfolk.
Richard	United Kingdom	The ship was driven from her anchorage and abandoned off Heligoland, but rode out the gale.

=== Unknown date ===
List of shipwrecks: Unknown date in October 1813
Ship	State	Description
Abeona	United Kingdom	The ship was lost near Wainfleet, Lincolnshire with the loss of three of her crew. She was on a voyage from Sunderland, County Durham to Boston, Lincolnshire.
Betsey	United Kingdom	The ship was driven ashore and wrecked at Ringborough, Yorkshire.
Betsey & Nelly	United Kingdom	The collier was wrecked on the South Knowl, in the North Sea off the mouth of the River Tees. Her crew were rescued.
USS Chippewa	United States Navy	The Sloop was driven ashore in a storm at Black Rock, New York.
HMS Dart	Royal Navy	The cutter either departed from Pernambuco, Brazil on 20 October, or departed from Halifax, Nova Scotia, British North America on 27 October. No further trace, presumed foundered with the loss of all hands.
Dart	United Kingdom	The ship ran aground at Dublin. She was on a voyage from Liverpool, Lancashire to Porto, Portugal.
Elbe	United Kingdom	The ship was lost on the Sandhammer Reef. She was on a voyage from Hull, Yorkshire to Saint Petersburg, Russia.
Elliota	United Kingdom	The ship was abandoned in Almeria Bay. She was later found by HMS Philomel (Royal Navy) and taken in to Alicante, Spain.
Fame	United Kingdom	The ship was lost on the coast of Finland. She was on a voyage from London to Saint Petersburg.
Felix	United Kingdom	The ship struck a rock in the Baltic Sea and was beached. She was on a voyage from Saint Petersburg to London.
Friendship	United Kingdom	The ship was wrecked on the Scarweather Sands, in the Bristol Channel. Her six crew were rescued.
Henrietta	United Kingdom	The ship was beached at Vigo, Spain. She was on a voyage from Cádiz, Spain to Cork.
Jane	United Kingdom	The collier was wrecked on the South Knowl. Her crew were rescued.
John	United Kingdom	The ship was lost at Domesnes, Norway. She was on a voyage from Riga, Russia to London.
John & Sisters	United Kingdom	The ship foundered in the North Sea off Winterton-on-Sea Norfolk with the loss of all hands.
Juliet	United Kingdom	The ship was lost in the Humber.
Leland	United Kingdom	The ship was driven ashore at "Culaff". She was on a voyage from "Penheyn" to Ireland.
Mary and Lydia	United Kingdom	The ship was abandoned in the Grand Banks of Newfoundland. Her crew were rescued by Malta (United Kingdom). She was on a voyage from Portsmouth, Hampshire to Quebec, British North America.
Nancy	United Kingdom	The ship was wrecked at Dublin. She was on a voyage from Plymouth, Devon to Liverpool, Lancashire.
Philip & Mary	United Kingdom	The ship was lost off Skagen, Denmark. She was on a voyage from Memel, Prussia to Dumfries.
Roscius	United Kingdom	The ship was wrecked in the Hebrides.
Salerno	United Kingdom	The ship was captured in the Atlantic Ocean (17°56′N 57°30′W) by the privateer Revenge (United States). She was set afire and sunk.
St. Ann	Sweden	The ship was driven ashore at Sandhammer. She was on a voyage from Stockholm to Gothenburg.
Sir Godfrey Webster	United Kingdom	The ship was leaving Bombay for London when she grounded. She had to return to dock and was expected to remain there for a month to six weeks.
USS Trippe	United States Navy	War of 1812: The Sloop ran aground in Buffalo Creek, near Buffalo, New York and was burned by the British sometime in October.
HMS Vautour	Royal Navy	The Sylphe-class brig foundered in the English Channel off Pentreath, Cornwall with the loss of all hands.
Watson	United Kingdom	The ship struck a rock off the Shetland Islands and foundered. She was on a voyage from Arkhangelsk, Russia to London.
Unnamed	United Kingdom	War of 1812: The collier was captured and sunk by the privateer True Blooded Yankee (United States).
Unnamed	Flag unknown	The brig struck a rock and sank in the Baltic Sea.

== November ==
=== 1 November ===
List of shipwrecks: 1 November 1813
Ship	State	Description
John	United Kingdom	The transport ship was wrecked at Passage West, County Cork.
Mary	United Kingdom	The ship was driven ashore near the "Leader Lighthouse". She was on a voyage from Newfoundland, British North America to Liverpool, Lancashire. She was refloated the next day but found to be severely leaky.
Princess Charlotte	United Kingdom	The ship was driven ashore at North Foreland, Kent. She was refloated and taken in to Kingsgate Bay, but was then driven out to sea in a gale.
Robert	United Kingdom	The ship ran aground on the Goodwin Sands, Kent. She was refloated but consequently foundered. Her crew were rescued. Robert was on a voyage from Hull, Yorkshire to Cádiz, Spain.

=== 2 November ===
List of shipwrecks: 2 November 1813
Ship	State	Description
Basilius	United Kingdom	The ship was driven ashore at Lowestoft, Suffolk. She was on a voyage from Arkhangelsk, Russia to London.
Inca	United States	War of 1812: The schooner, a letter of marque, was run onto the Cape Romain Shoals by HMS Doterel and HMS Recruit (both Royal Navy).
Iris	United Kingdom	The ship was driven ashore 10 nautical miles (19 km) from Åbo, Grand Duchy of Finland with the loss of three of her crew. She was on a voyage from London to Reval, Russia.
Liberty	United Kingdom	The ship was driven ashore on the Peeran Sand, Cornwall. She was late refloated and taken in to Penzance, Cornwall.
Maria	United Kingdom	The ship was destroyed by fire off the coast of Spain. She was on a voyage from Mallorca to Gibraltar and London.
Robert	United Kingdom	The ship was wrecked on the Goodwin Sands, Kent. Her crew were rescued.

=== 3 November ===
List of shipwrecks: 3 November 1813
Ship	State	Description
Ann	United Kingdom	The ship was lost near Great Yarmouth, Norfolk. Her crew were rescued. She was on a voyage from Blyth, Northumberland to Faversham, Kent.
Ann	United Kingdom	The brig was wrecked near Capbreton, Landes, France.
Apollo	United Kingdom	The ship sank at Whitehaven, Cumberland. Her crew were rescued. She was on a voyage from Dublin to Liverpool, Lancashire.
Friends	United Kingdom	The ship was driven ashore and wrecked at Mablethorpe, Lincolnshire.
Nelson	United Kingdom	The ship was driven ashore at Great Yarmouth.

=== 4 November ===
List of shipwrecks: 4 November 1813
Ship	State	Description
Southampton	United Kingdom	The ship was lost near Newfoundland, British North America with the loss of two of her crew.
Thomas Jefferson	United Kingdom	War of the Sixth Coalition: The ship was captured and burnt by the privateer Lion (France). She was on a voyage from Tenerife to Belfast, County Antrim.

=== 5 November ===
List of shipwrecks: 5 November 1813
Ship	State	Description
HMS Tweed	Royal Navy	The ship-sloop was wrecked on the coast of Newfoundland, British North America with the loss of 70 of her 122 crew.
Three unnamed vessels	United Kingdom	The transport ships were wrecked at Passage West, County Cork.

=== 6 November ===
List of shipwrecks: 6 November 1813
Ship	State	Description
Martha	United Kingdom	The ship foundered in the English Channel off Dover, Kent. Her crew were rescued. She was on a voyage from Lyme, Dorset to London.
Shalholt	Denmark	The ship was lost on this date.

=== 7 November ===
List of shipwrecks: 7 November 1813
Ship	State	Description
Ceres	United Kingdom	War of the Sixth Coalition: The ship was driven ashore 2 nautical miles (3.7 km) west of Rye Harbour, Sussex by two French privateers. She was on a voyage from Cowes, Isle of Wight to Sunderland, County Durham.
Elizabeth Christina	Sweden	The ship ran aground and capsized near King's Lynn, Norfolk, United Kingdom. She was on a voyage from King's Lynn to St. Ubes, Portugal.
Endeavour	United Kingdom	The ship departed from Gibraltar for London. No further trace, presumed foundered with the loss of all hands.

=== 8 November ===
List of shipwrecks: 8 November 1813
Ship	State	Description
Speculation	United Kingdom	The ship was wrecked in the Baltic Sea off Memel, Prussia. She was on a voyage from Saint Petersburg, Russia to Pillau, Prussia.

=== 9 November ===
List of shipwrecks: 9 November 1813
Ship	State	Description
Duke	United Kingdom	The ship was lost near Hiiumaa, Russia. She was on a voyage from Saint Petersburg, Russia to London.

=== 10 November ===
List of shipwrecks: 10 November 1813
Ship	State	Description
HMS Atalante	Royal Navy	The sloop-of-war foundered in the Atlantic Ocean off Halifax, Nova Scotia, British North America. Her crew were rescued.

=== 11 November ===
List of shipwrecks: 11 November 1813
Ship	State	Description
Nestor	United Kingdom	The ship was wrecked on the Gunfleet Sand, in the North Sea.
Trial	United Kingdom	The ship was abandoned in the Irish Sea off Dinas Head, Pembrokeshire. She was on a voyage from Waterford to Milford Haven, Pembrokeshire. Trial came ashore the next day at Aberdovey, Merionethshire.

=== 12 November ===
List of shipwrecks: 12 November 1813
Ship	State	Description
Ann	United Kingdom	The brig was driven ashore at Halifax, Nova Scotia, British North America.
Astrea	United Kingdom	The brig was driven ashore and severely damaged at Halifax.
Atlantic	United Kingdom	The brig was driven ashore at Halifax.
Bellona	United Kingdom	The brig sank at Halifax with the loss of four of her crew.
HMS Canso	Royal Navy	The schooner was driven ashore and severely damaged at Halifax. She was later returned to service.
Charlotta	Sweden	The ship was driven ashore at Dartmouth, Nova Scotia. She was later refloated.
Christiana	Spain	The brig was driven ashore at Halifax.
Concord	United Kingdom	The schooner was driven ashore at Halifax.
Deborah	United Kingdom	The schooner was driven ashore and wrecked at Prospect, Nova Scotia.
Dick	United Kingdom	The transport ship was driven ashore at Halifax.
Divina Pastora	Spain	The full-rigged ship was driven ashore at Halifax.
Dove	United Kingdom	The schooner was driven ashore at Halifax.
Edward	United Kingdom	The schooner was driven ashore at Halifax.
Eight Brothers	United Kingdom	The schooner was driven ashore and wrecked at Prospect.
Eliza	United Kingdom	The schooner was driven ashore at Prospect. She was later refloated.
Elizabeth	United Kingdom	The schooner was driven ashore and wrecked at Prospect.
Elvira	Spain	The sloop was driven ashore and wrecked at Halifax.
HMS Epervier	Royal Navy	The brig was driven ashore and damaged at Halifax. Later repaired and returned to service.
HMS Fantome	Royal Navy	The brig was driven ashore at Halifax. Later returned to service.
Farragon	United Kingdom	The schooner was driven ashore and wrecked at Halifax.
Ferdinand	United Kingdom	The schooner was driven ashore at Halifax.
Fortuna	Russia	The ship was driven ashore and wrecked on Öland, Sweden. She was on a voyage from Riga to Leith, Lothian, United Kingdom.
Friends Adventure	United Kingdom	The schooner was driven ashore at Halifax.
Friends Goodwill	United Kingdom	The sloop was driven ashore and wrecked near Dover, Kent.
Friendship	United Kingdom	The brig was driven ashore at Halifax.
George	United Kingdom	The schooner was driven ashore at Halifax.
Hannah	United Kingdom	The schooner was driven ashore and wrecked at Prospect.
Henry	United Kingdom	The sloop was driven ashore and wrecked at Halifax.
John	United Kingdom	The ship was driven ashore at Halifax.
John and Mary	United Kingdom	The brig was driven ashore at Halifax.
Jubilee	United Kingdom	The full-rigged ship was driven ashore at Halifax.
Juno	United Kingdom	The full-rigged ship was driven ashore at Halifax.
HMS La Hogue	Royal Navy	The Vengeur-class ship of the line was driven ashore at Halifax. Later repaired and returned to service.
HMS Maidstone	Royal Navy	The fifth rate was driven ashore and severely damaged at Halifax. Later repaired and returned to service.
HM Hired armed brig Manly.	Royal Navy	The hired armed brig was driven ashore and severely damaged at Halifax.
Manly	United Kingdom	The schooner was driven ashore at Halifax.
Mariner	United Kingdom	The brig was driven ashore at Halifax.
Massachusetts	United States	The prize ship was driven ashore at Halifax.
Mary of Portland	United Kingdom	The schooner was driven ashore at Halifax.
Ned	United Kingdom	The full-rigged ship was driven ashore at Halifax.
Nancy	United Kingdom	The brig was driven ashore and severely damaged at Halifax.
Paragon	United Kingdom	The schooner was bilged and had her stern stove in at Halifax.
Paragon	United Kingdom	The full-rigged ship was driven ashore and damaged at Halifax.
Paris	United Kingdom	The barque was driven ashore at Halifax.
Patriota	Spain	The polacca was driven ashore at Halifax.
Peter	United Kingdom	The ship was driven ashore in Stokes Bay. She was on a voyage from Portsmouth, Hampshire to Teignmouth, Devon.
Princess Mary	United Kingdom	The full-rigged ship was driven ashore at Halifax. She was later refloated.
Prudence	United Kingdom	The schooner was driven ashore at Prospect. She was later refloated.
Rachael & Mary	United Kingdom	The schooner was driven ashore at Halifax.
Robert	United Kingdom	The ship was driven ashore in Inhabitant's Bay. She was on a voyage from Prince Edward Island, British North America to London.
Sally	United States	The prize schooner was driven ashore at Halifax.
HMS San Domingo	Royal Navy	The Courageux-class ship of the line was driven ashore at Halifax. Later repaired and returned to service.
Sir George Prevost	United Kingdom	The ship was driven ashore on "Kamarca". She was on a voyage from Quebec City, British North America to an English port. She was refloated and put back to Quebec City.
Thomas	United Kingdom	The full-rigged ship was driven ashore and damaged at Halifax.
Three Sisters	United Kingdom	The transport ship sank at Halifax.
Venus	United Kingdom	The full-rigged ship was driven ashore and wrecked at Halifax.
Venus	Sweden	The ship was driven ashore and wrecked at Halifax.
Wildeman	Sweden	The ship was wrecked on Götaland. She was on a voyage from Libava, Courland Governorate to Gothenburg.
William	United Kingdom	The brig was driven ashore at and severely damaged at Halifax.
Unnamed	Flag unknown	The brig was driven ashore and wrecked at Halifax.
Unnamed	United States	The sloop was driven ashore at Halifax.
Unnamed	United Kingdom	The shallop was driven ashore at Dartmouth Point, Nova Scotia.
Unnamed	United Kingdom	The schooner sank at Halifax.
Unnamed	Flag unknown	The brig was driven ashore at Halifax.
Unnamed	United Kingdom	The schooner was driven ashore at Halifax.

=== 13 November ===
List of shipwrecks: 13 November 1813
Ship	State	Description
HMS Anaconda	Royal Navy	The brig-sloop was severely damaged at Halifax, Nova Scotia, British North America by other vessels driving foul of her.
Ann	United Kingdom	The brig was driven ashore at Halifax.
HMS Arab	Royal Navy	The sixth rate post ship was severely damaged at Halifax by other vessels driving foul of her.
Astrea	United Kingdom	The brig was driven ashore at Halifax.
Atlantic	United Kingdom	The brig was driven ashore at Halifax.
Bellona	United Kingdom	The brig sank at Halifax with the loss of four of her crew.
HMS Canso	Royal Navy	The schooner was driven ashore at Halifax. She was later refloated.
Charlotta	Sweden	The ship was driven ashore at Dartmouth. She was later refloated.
Christiana	United Kingdom	The brig was driven ashore at Halifax.
Concord	United Kingdom	The schooner was driven ashore at Halifax.
Deborah	United Kingdom	The schooner was driven ashore and wrecked at Prospect, Nova Scotia.
Dick	United Kingdom	The transport ship was driven ashore at Halifax.
Divina Pastora	United Kingdom	The ship was driven ashore at Tufts Cove, Nova Scotia.
Dove	United Kingdom	The schooner was driven ashore at Halifax.
Edward	United Kingdom	The schooner was driven ashore at Halifax.
Eight Brothers	United Kingdom	The schooner was driven ashore and wrecked at Prospect.
Eliza	United Kingdom	The schooner was driven ashore at Prospect. She was later refloated.
Elizabeth	United Kingdom	The schooner was driven ashore and wrecked at Prospect.
Elvira	United Kingdom	The sloop capsized at Halifax with the loss of three of her crew. She came ashore and was wrecked.
HMS Epervier	Royal Navy	The Cruizer-class brig-sloop was driven ashore north of Tufts Cove. She was later refloated.
HMS Fantome	Royal Navy	The brig-sloop was driven ashore north of Tufts Cove. She was later refloated.
Farragon	United Kingdom	The schooner was driven ashore at Halifax.
Friendship	United Kingdom	The brig was driven ashore at Halifax.
Ferdinand	United Kingdom	The schooner was driven ashore at Dartmouth, Nova Scotia.
Four Sons	United Kingdom	The schooner was driven ashore at Halifax.
Friends Adventure	United Kingdom	The schooner was driven ashore at Halifax.
George	United Kingdom	The schooner was driven ashore at Halifax.
Gleaner	United Kingdom	The sloop was driven ashore at Halifax.
Hannah	United Kingdom	The schooner was driven ashore and wrecked at Prospect.
Henry	United Kingdom	The sloop sank at Halifax.
HMS Hyaena	Royal Navy	The store ship was damaged at Halifax.
John and Mary	United Kingdom	The brig was driven ashore at Halifax.
Jubilee	United Kingdom	The full-rigged ship was driven ashore at Halifax.
Juno	United Kingdom	The ship was driven ashore at Halifax.
HMS La Hogue	Royal Navy	The Vengeur-class ship of the line was driven ashore at Halifax. She was later refloated.
HMS Maidstone	Royal Navy	The fifth-rate was driven ashore at Halifax. She was later refloated.
Manby	United Kingdom	The full-rigged ship was driven ashore on George's Island, Nova Scotia. She floated off.
HMS Manly	Royal Navy	The Bold-class gun-brig was driven ashore at Halifax. She was refloated three weeks later.
Manly	United Kingdom	The schooner was driven ashore at Halifax.
Mariner	United Kingdom	The brig was driven ashore at Halifax.
Massachusetts	United States	The ship was driven ashore at Halifax.
HMS Morgiana	Royal Navy	The brig was severely damaged at Halifax by other vessels driving foul of her.
Nancy	United Kingdom	The brig was driven ashore at Halifax and was severely damaged.
Ned	United Kingdom	The ship was driven ashore at Tufts Cove.
HMS Nemesis	Royal Navy	The Enterprise-class frigate was severely damaged at Halifax by other vessels driving foul of her.
HMS Nymphen	Royal Navy	The fifth rate was severely damaged at Halifax by other vessels driving foul of her.
Ordnance	United Kingdom	The schooner was damaged at Halifax by another vessel driving foul of her.
Paragoa	United Kingdom	The schooner was driven ashore and wrecked at Halifax.
Paragon	United Kingdom	The ship was driven ashore at Halifax.
Paris	United Kingdom	The barque was driven ashore at Dartmouth.
Pieter	United Kingdom	The ship was driven ashore in Stokes Bay. She was on a voyage from Portsmouth, Hampshire to Teignmouth, Devon. Pieter was refloated on 7 December, undamaged. (See also 10 December)
HMS Poictiers	Royal Navy	The Vengeur-class ship of the line was severely damaged at Halifax by other vessels driving into her.
Princess Mary	United Kingdom	The ship was damaged at Halifax by a Portuguese vessel driving foul of her. She subsequently went driven ashore north of Tufts Cove. She was later refloated.
Prudence	United Kingdom	The schooner was driven ashore at Prospect. She was later refloated.
Rachel and Mary	United Kingdom	The schooner was driven ashore at Halifax.
HMS Romulus	Royal Navy	The Flora-class frigate was severely damaged at Halifax by other vessels driving foul of her.
HMS San Domingo	Royal Navy	The Courageux-class ship of the line was driven ashore at Halifax. She was later refloated.
Sally	United States	The schooner was driven ashore at Halifax.
HMS Shelburne	Royal Navy	The schooner was severely damaged at Halifax by other vessels driving foul of her. A crew member was lost.
Star	United Kingdom	The full-rigged ship driven ashore north of Tufts Cove.
Subtile	France	War of the Sixth Coalition: HMS Seahorse (Royal Navy) captured the privateer in the English Channel off Beachy Head, Sussex, United Kingdom. Subtile subsequently foundered with the loss of 49 of her 72 crew.
HMS Success	Royal Navy	The ship was severely damaged at Halifax by other vessels driving foul of her.
HMS Swift	Royal Navy	The store ship was damaged at Halifax by another vessel driving foul of her.
HMS Tenedos	Royal Navy	The fifth rate was severely damaged at Halifax by other vessels driving foul of her.
Thomas	United Kingdom	The ship was driven ashore north of Tufts Cove.
Three Sisters	United Kingdom	The transport ship sank at Halifax.
Venus	United Kingdom	The ship was driven ashore and wrecked at Halifax.
Venus	Sweden	The ship was driven ashore at Halifax.
HMS Victorious	Royal Navy	The Swiftsure-class ship of the line was severely damaged at Halifax by other vessels driving foul of her.
William	United Kingdom	The brig was driven ashore at Dartmouth.
Unnamed	Flag unknown	The schooner sank at Halifax with the loss of a crew member.

=== 14 November ===
List of shipwrecks: 14 November 1813
Ship	State	Description
Clio	United Kingdom	The ship ran aground off the Galloper Lightship ( Trinity House) and foundered. Her crew were rescued. She was on a voyage from Sunderland, County Durham to Littlehampton, Sussex.
Gute Erwagding	Flag unknown	The ship was abandoned off the Nore, being dismasted and waterlogged.
Shannon	United Kingdom	The ship was driven ashore on Green Island, in the Saint Lawrence River. She was on a voyage from Quebec City, Lower Canada, British North America to Belfast, County Antrim.
Union	United Kingdom	The ship was driven ashore at Abergele, Denbighshire. She was on a voyage from Sligo to Liverpool, Lancashire.

=== 15 November ===
List of shipwrecks: 15 November 1813
Ship	State	Description
Mary	United Kingdom	The ship was in collision with HMS President (Royal Navy) and sank in Torbay. She was on a voyage from Cork to London. Mary was later refloated and taken in to Brixham, Devon.
Susan	United Kingdom	The ship was driven ashore and wrecked on Düne with the loss of a crew member.

=== 16 November ===
List of shipwrecks: 16 November 1813
Ship	State	Description
Gaditana	Spain	The ship was driven ashore at Atherfield, Isle of Wight, United Kingdom. She was on a voyage from Havana, Cuba to Cádiz, Spain.

=== 17 November ===
List of shipwrecks: 17 November 1813
Ship	State	Description
Brothers	United Kingdom	The ship was lost at Whitehaven, Cumberland. Her passengers and crew were rescued by the Whitehaven Lifeboat. She was on a voyage from Bangor to Whitehaven.
George	United Kingdom	The ship was wrecked at Wyre Water, Cumberland with the loss of all hands. She was on a voyage from Whitehaven, Cumberland to Waterford.
Mary	United Kingdom	The ship was driven ashore at Aberporth, Cardiganshire. Her crew were rescued. She was on a voyage from Dublin to London. Mary was refloated on 6 December and taken in to Cardigan.
Susannah	United Kingdom	The ship foundered in the North Sea. Her crew were rescued.

=== 18 November ===
List of shipwrecks: 18 November 1813
Ship	State	Description
Catherina	United Kingdom	The ship was wrecked on the coast of Jutland. Her crew were rescued. She was on a voyage from Leith, Lothian to Heligoland.

=== 19 November ===
List of shipwrecks: 19 November 1813
Ship	State	Description
William and Ann	United Kingdom	The ship sprang a leak and foundered in the North Sea. Her crew were rescued. She was on a voyage from Sunderland, County Durham to Scarborough, Yorkshire.

=== 20 November ===
List of shipwrecks: 20 November 1813
Ship	State	Description
Richard	United Kingdom	The ship was wrecked on the Norwegian coast. Her crew survived but were taken as prisoners of war.

=== 21 November ===
List of shipwrecks: 21 November 1813
Ship	State	Description
Jeanie	United Kingdom	The sloop was wrecked on the Mull of Kintyre, Argyllshire. Her crew were rescued.
Jessie	United Kingdom	The ship departed from Málaga, Spain for Dublin. No further trace, presumed foundered with the loss of all hands.
Venus	United Kingdom	The ship departed from St. Ubes, Portugal for London. No further trace, presumed foundered with the loss of all hands.

=== 22 November ===
List of shipwrecks: 22 November 1813
Ship	State	Description
Apollo	United Kingdom	The ship was wrecked near the Pentland Firth. Her crew were rescued. She was on a voyage from Shediac, British North America to Newcastle-upon-Tyne, Northumberland.

=== 24 November ===
List of shipwrecks: 24 November 1813
Ship	State	Description
Edmund and Mary	United Kingdom	The ship was holed by her anchor and sank at Limerick. She was on a voyage from Limerick to Plymouth, Devon.
General Hodgkinson	United Kingdom	War of 1812: The sloop, a prize of Saratoga (United States), was wrecked off Charleston, South Carolina, United States.

=== 25 November ===
List of shipwrecks: 25 November 1813
Ship	State	Description
Maister	United Kingdom	The ship was on her way from Hull to Martinique when HMS Bulwark ran into her off the Owers. The collision dismasted Maister, which went into Cowes the next day.

=== 26 November ===
List of shipwrecks: 26 November 1813
Ship	State	Description
James & Ann	United Kingdom	The ship departed from Cork for Bilbao, Spain. No further trace, presumed foundered with the loss of all hands.
Little Catharine	United Kingdom	War of the Sixth Coalition: The packet ship was discovered abandoned in the Atlantic Ocean by HMS Hotspur (Royal Navy). She was taken in to Penzance, Cornwall, where she arrived on 30 November. It was supposed that she had been captured.
Pakenham	United Kingdom	The ship was driven ashore and wrecked on Götaland, Sweden. She was on a voyage from Saint Petersburg, Russia to London.

=== 27 November ===
List of shipwrecks: 27 November 1813
Ship	State	Description
Liberty	United Kingdom	The ship ran aground at Campbeltown, Argyllshire. She was on a voyage from Greenock, Renfrewshire to Malta.
Phoebe	United Kingdom	War of 1812 / War of the Sixth Coalition: The ship was captured by the letter of marque General Armstrong (United States). She was on a voyage from Falmouth, Cornwall to Madeira. Phoebe was subsequently sunk by two French Navy frigates.

=== 28 November ===
List of shipwrecks: 28 November 1813
Ship	State	Description
Mary	United Kingdom	The ship was wrecked on the Stoney Binks, in the North Sea off the coast of County Durham. She was on a voyage from Heligoland to Hull, Yorkshire.
Unity	United Kingdom	The ship foundered in the North Sea off the mouth of the Humber. Her crew were rescued.

=== 29 November ===
List of shipwrecks: 29 November 1813
Ship	State	Description
Aurora	Spain	The ship was wrecked on Anegada, Virgin Islands. Her crew were rescued. She was on a voyage from Cádiz to Veracruz.
Dolphin	United Kingdom	The ship was wrecked on "Cababello". Her crew were rescued.

=== 30 November ===
List of shipwrecks: 30 November 1813
Ship	State	Description
Benjamin and Mary	United Kingdom	The ship ran aground and was severely damaged on the Herd Sand, in the North Sea off South Shields, County Durham. She was on a voyage from Gothenburg, Sweden to London. Benjamin and Mary was later refloated and taken in to Newcastle upon Tyne, Northumberland.
Dolphin	United Kingdom	The ship was run ashore at Porto, Portugal. She was on a voyage from Newfoundland to Porto.
São Joze & São Joao Baptista	Portugal	The ship was driven ashore and wrecked on Öland, Sweden. She was on a voyage from Saint Petersburg, Russia to Lisbon.
Triton	United Kingdom	The ship was run down by another vessel and was abandoned by her crew, who were rescued by Spanish Patriot (United Kingdom). Triton was later discovered by HMS Scylla (Royal Navy) and taken in to St. Mary's, Isles of Scilly).

=== Unknown date ===
List of shipwrecks: Unknown date in November 1813
Ship	State	Description
Betsey	United Kingdom	The ship foundered with the loss of all hands whilst on a voyage from Passage West, County Cork to Dublin.
Bridlington	United Kingdom	The transport ship was destroyed by fire at Stralsund, Swedish Pomerania.
Catherine and Caroline	United Kingdom	War of the Sixth Coalition: The ship was captured and scuttled by the privateer Eugene (France).
Christina	Sweden	The ship was lost on Odesholm. She was on a voyage from Stockholm to Reval, Russia.
Commerce	United Kingdom	The ship was wrecked at Caernarfon. Her crew were rescued. She was on a voyage from Buenos Aires to Liverpool, Lancashire.
Darling	United Kingdom	The ship was wrecked on Anholt, Denmark with the loss of her captain. She was on a voyage from Pillau, Prussia to London.
Edward	United Kingdom	The ship was driven ashore and wrecked at Rostock. She was on a voyage from Stockholm, Sweden to London.
Frederia Gustava	Sweden	The ship sprang a leak and foundered in the North Sea whilst on a voyage from Stockholm to[London.
Gatedana	Spain	War of the Sixth Coalition: The ship was captured and driven ashore near Portland, Dorset, United Kingdom. She was on a voyage from Havana, Cuba to Cádiz. Gatedana was subsequently refloated and repaired. She departed from Cowes, Isle of Wight on 27 August 1814 for Cádiz.
Grace	United Kingdom	The ship departed from Cork for Newfoundland, British North America. No further trace, presumed foundered with the loss of all hands.
Greyhound	United Kingdom	The cutter ran aground on the Middle Sand, in the North Sea off the coast of Essex and sank. She was on a voyage from London to Passage West, County Cork.
Henrietta	Prussia	The ship was driven ashore at Gothenburg, Sweden. She was on a voyage from Liebau to London.
Hope	United Kingdom	The ship foundered in the North Sea. Her crew were rescued. She was on a voyage from Gothenburg to Perth.
Industry	United Kingdom	The ship was lost in the Sound of Mull. Her crew were rescued. She was on a voyage from Wexford to London.
Lord Hood	United Kingdom	The ship was driven ashore and wrecked at Arkhangelsk, Russia. She was on a voyage from Arkhangelsk to Hull, Yorkshire.
Margaretha	Sweden	The ship departed from St. Ubes, Portugal for Cork and Gothenburg. No further trace, presumed foundered with the loss of all hands.
Mars	United Kingdom	War of the Sixth Coalition: The ship was captured and burnt by the privateer Lion (France). She was on a voyage from Cádiz to Newfoundland.
Mary	United Kingdom	The ship was driven ashore and wrecked on Tory Island, County Donegal. She was on a voyage from Sligo to Liverpool, Lancashire.
Nancy	United Kingdom	The full-rigged ship foundered in the North Sea before 22 November. Her crew were rescued by HMS Aggressor (Royal Navy).
Neptunus	Sweden	The ship was lost with all hands. She was on a voyage from Leith, Lothian, United Kingdom to Wismar, Swedish Pomerania.
Rose	United Kingdom	The ship was driven ashore on the Isle of Man. She was on a voyage from Maryport, Cumberland to Belfast, County Antrim.
Sunton	United Kingdom	The ship was driven ashore in Loch Ryan. She was on a voyage from Miramichi, New Brunswick, British North America to the Clyde.
Sussex	United Kingdom	The ship was wrecked at Ventava, Courland Governorate. She was on a voyage from Windau to London.
Syren	United Kingdom	War of the Sixth Coalition: The ship was captured and scuttled by the privateer Eugene (France). She was on a voyage from Newfoundland to Cork.
Victoria	(United Kingdom of Great Britain and Ireland) Guernsey	War of the Sixth Coalition: The privateer was captured by two French Navy frigates, a French Navy brig and two American letters of marque. She was set afire and sunk.

== December ==
=== 1 December ===
List of shipwrecks: 1 December 1813
Ship	State	Description
Alfred	United Kingdom	The ship foundered in the Atlantic Ocean. Some of her crew were rescued by HMS Severn (Royal Navy). A ship of this name was discovered at sea on 7 December by Mercurio Felix (Portugal) and taken in to "Mooros". Alfred was on a voyage from London to Antigua.
Britannia	United Kingdom	War of 1812: The ship was driven ashore in Loch Indaal by the privateer True Blooded Yankee (United States) and was burnt. She was on a voyage from Liverpool, Lancashire to Westport, County Mayo.
Catharina	Russia	The ship foundered in the Atlantic Ocean off Land's End, Cornwall, United Kingdom. Her crew were rescued. She was on a voyage from Saint Petersburg to Lisbon, Portugal.
Friends	United Kingdom	War of 1812: The brig was driven ashore in Loch Indaal by the privateer True Blooded Yankee (United States) and was burnt. She was on a voyage from Galway to Greenock, Renfrewshire.
Mary	United Kingdom	War of 1812: The brig was driven ashore in Loch Indaal by the privateer True Blooded Yankee (United States).
Seven unnamed vessels	Flags unknown	The ships foundered in the Atlantic Ocean.

=== 2 December ===
List of shipwrecks: 2 December 1813
Ship	State	Description
Active	United Kingdom	The ship was driven ashore near Kilrush, County Clare. She was on a voyage from Cork to St Andero, Spain. Active was refloated on 5 December.
Alert	United Kingdom	The ship was last seen on this date whilst on a voyage from Gibraltar to London. Presumed foundered with the loss of all hands.
Amelia	United Kingdom	The ship was run ashore at Balbriggan, County Dublin. She was on a voyage from Liverpool, Lancashire to Cádiz, Spain and Rio de Janeiro.
Ceres	United Kingdom	The transport ship was lost at A Coruña, Spain with the loss of all but one of her crew.
Criterion	United Kingdom	The whaler was driven ashore at Nantucket, Massachusetts, United States.
George	United Kingdom	The ship sprang a leak and was abandoned by her crew. They were rescued by Sir William Bensley United Kingdom. George was on a voyage from Quebec City. Lower Canada, British North America to London.
Hull Packet	United Kingdom	The ship was driven ashore and wrecked near Southwold, Suffolk. She was on a voyage from London to King's Lynn, Norfolk.
USS Lady of the Lake	United States Navy	The schooner was driven ashore between Ten Mile Creek and Twelve Mile Creek, Ontario, British North America.
USS Madison	United States Navy	The ship sank off Niagara-on-the-Lake, Ontario.
Margaretta Dorothea	Russia	The ship was driven ashore on Götaland, Sweden. She was on a voyage from Riga to London.

=== 3 December ===
List of shipwrecks: 3 December 1813
Ship	State	Description
George	United Kingdom	The ship sprang a leak and foundered in the Atlantic Ocean. She was on a voyage from Quebec, British North America to London. Her crew were rescued by Sir William Bensley (United Kingdom.
London Packet	United Kingdom	The ship departed from Spithead for Havana, Cuba. No further trace, presumed foundered with the loss of all hands.
Maria Anna	Sweden	The ship was wrecked on the Herd Sand, in the North Sea. She was on a voyage from Gothenburg to Hull, Yorkshire, United Kingdom.

=== 4 December ===
List of shipwrecks: 4 December 1813
Ship	State	Description
Melburne	United Kingdom	The transport ship was driven ashore near A Coruña, Spain. She was on a voyage from Porto, Portugal to Santander, Spain.
Venus	United Kingdom	War of the Sixth Coalition: The brig was captured and sunk by Étoile and Sultane (both French Navy).
Wohlfahrt	Prussia	The ship ran aground off Ystad, Sweden. She was on a voyage from Gothenburg, Sweden to Königsberg.
Four unnamed vessels	United Kingdom	The ships were wrecked between La-Teste-du-Buch and Mimizan, Landes, France.

=== 5 December ===
List of shipwrecks: 5 December 1813
Ship	State	Description
Aurora	United Kingdom	The ship was captured in the Atlantic Ocean (44°30′N 10°30′W by Clorinde and another frigate (both French Navy). She was set afire and sunk. She was on a voyage from Dover, Kent to San Sebastián, Puerto Rico.
Blendon	United Kingdom	The ship was captured in the Atlantic Ocean (44°30′N 10°30′W by Clorinde and another frigate (both French Navy). She was abandoned and subsequently found by the packet ship Eliza United Kingdom). Blendon was taken in to Plymouth, Devon by HMS Challenger (Royal Navy).
Hull Packet	United Kingdom	The ship was driven ashore and wrecked near Southwold, Suffolk. She was on a voyage from London to King's Lynn, Norfolk.
Jamaica	United Kingdom	The ship was abandoned whilst on a voyage from Liverpool, Lancashire to Rio de Janeiro. Her crew survived. She was subsequently discovered by HMS Pyramus (Royal Navy) and was set afire due to her poor condition.
John O'Gaunt	United Kingdom	The ship was captured in the Atlantic Ocean (44°30′N 10°30′W by Clorinde and another frigate (both French Navy). She was set afire and sunk.
Mary	United Kingdom	The ship was wrecked on the Stoney Binks, in the North Sea off the mouth of the Humber. She was on a voyage from Heligoland to Hull, Yorkshire.
Superb	United Kingdom	The ship was captured in the Atlantic Ocean (44°30′N 10°30′W by Clorinde and another frigate (both French Navy). She was set afire and sunk.
Unity	United Kingdom	The ship was wrecked on the Stoney Binks.
Willock	United Kingdom	The ship was driven ashore near "Crooked End". She was on a voyage from North Shields, County Durham to London.

=== 7 December ===
List of shipwrecks: 7 December 1813
Ship	State	Description
Henrietta	United Kingdom	War of 1812: The ship was captured by an American letter of marque whilst on a voyage from Falmouth, Jamaica to the Turks Islands. She was set afire and sunk.

=== 8 December ===
List of shipwrecks: 8 December 1813
Ship	State	Description
Equity	United Kingdom	War of 1812: The ship was captured in the Atlantic Ocean (51°30′N 11°20′W) by the privateer Rattlesnake (United States) whilst on a voyage from London to Limerick. She was set afire and sunk.
Leonidas	United Kingdom	The transport ship was destroyed by fire at Deptford, Kent.
Wohlfahr	Sweden	The ship ran aground off Ystad and was wrecked. She was on a voyage from Gothenburg to Königsberg, Prussia.

=== 9 December ===
List of shipwrecks: 9 December 1813
Ship	State	Description
Adston	United Kingdom	War of 1812: The ship was captured by the privateer Rattlesnake (United States) whilst on a voyage from Lisbon, Portugal to London. She was scuttled.

=== 10 December ===
List of shipwrecks: 10 December 1813
Ship	State	Description
Pieter	United Kingdom	The ship struck on a sandbank entering Teignmouth, Devon, and was then driven ashore. She was on a voyage from Portsmouth, Hampshire (see also 13 November).

=== 11 December ===
List of shipwrecks: 11 December 1813
Ship	State	Description
Fortune	United Kingdom	The ship was destroyed by fire at Cagliari, Sardinia.

=== 12 December ===
List of shipwrecks: 12 December 1813
Ship	State	Description
Fortuna	Russia	The ship was driven ashore on Gotland, Sweden. She was on a voyage from Riga to Leith, Lothian, United Kingdom.
Liberty	United Kingdom	War of 1812: The ship was captured and burnt by the privateer Rattlesnake (United States). She was on a voyage from Lisbon, Portugal to London.
Monticello	United Kingdom	War of the Sixth Coalition: The ship was captured and destroyed by Minerve and Nymphe (both French Navy). She was on a voyage from the Cape of Good Hope to London.
Peace	United Kingdom	War of the Sixth Coalition: The ship was captured and sunk by Étoile and Sultane (both French Navy whilst on a voyage from London to Senegal.

=== 13 December ===
List of shipwrecks: 13 December 1813
Ship	State	Description
Liberty	United Kingdom	War of 1812: The ship was captured in the Atlantic Ocean by the privateer Rattlesnake (United States). She was set afire and sunk.

=== 15 December ===
List of shipwrecks: 15 December 1813
Ship	State	Description
Fortune	United Kingdom	The hoy was wrecked on the Stag Rock, Freshwater, Isle of Wight with the loss of at least 33 lives. There were seven survivors.

=== 16 December ===
List of shipwrecks: 16 December 1813
Ship	State	Description
Queen Charlotte	United Kingdom	The ship foundered off San Sebastián, Spain with the loss of sixteen of her crew.
Supply	United Kingdom	The brig was run down and sunk off Littlehampton by Hawkesbury (United Kingdom) with the loss of two of her crew.
William Pitt	British East India Company	The East Indiaman foundered off the Cape of Good Hope with the loss of all hands.

=== 17 December ===
List of shipwrecks: 17 December 1813
Ship	State	Description
Providence	United Kingdom	The ship was wrecked at Mizen Head, County Galway with the loss of four of her crew.

=== 18 December ===
List of shipwrecks: 18 December 1813
Ship	State	Description
Adventure	United Kingdom	The ship ran ashore on the Saintes. She was taken possession of by the French, refloated and taken in to Audierne, Finistère. Adventure was on a voyage from Seville, Spain to London.
Emulacion	Spain	War of the Sixth Coalition: The ship was captured and sunk in the Atlantic Ocean by Étoile and Sultane (both French Navy) whilst on a voyage from Tenerife, Canary Islands to the United States.

=== 19 December ===
List of shipwrecks: 20 December 1813
Ship	State	Description
San Rafael	Spain	War of the Sixth Coalition: The brig was captured and sunk by Étoile and Sultane (both French Navy). She was on a voyage from Mallorca to Rio de Janeiro.

=== 20 December ===
List of shipwrecks: 20 December 1813
Ship	State	Description
Ann	United Kingdom	The brig was wrecked near Capbreton, Landes, France.
Societé	United Kingdom	The ship was sighted on this date whilst on a voyage from London to Bermuda. No further trace, presumed foundered with the loss of all hands.
Tartar	United States	This Baltimore privateer was driven ashore and wrecked during a storm near Cape Henry, Virginia, on her maiden voyage. Six men froze to death.

=== 21 December ===
List of shipwrecks: 21 December 1813
Ship	State	Description
Thames	United Kingdom	War of the Sixth Coalition: The transport ship was sunk in an engagement with the privateer Auguste (France).

=== 22 December ===
List of shipwrecks: 22 December 1813
Ship	State	Description
Nimble	United Kingdom	The ship was last sighted on this date. She was on a voyage from Saint Lucia to Liverpool, Lancashire. Presumed foundered with the loss of all hands. Actually, the privateer Invincible had captured her on 7 January 1814; the British recaptured her and sent her into Bermuda.

=== 23 December ===
List of shipwrecks: 23 December 1813
Ship	State	Description
Florida	Spain	War of 1812: The ship was captured and sunk by the letter of marque Cleopatra (United States). She was on a voyage from New Providence, New Jersey, United States to Amelia Island, East Florida, New Spain.
Jane	United Kingdom	The brig was wrecked near Capbreton, Landes, France.

=== 25 December ===
List of shipwrecks: 25 December 1813
Ship	State	Description
Charlotte	United Kingdom	The ship was wrecked in Carbonear Bay, Newfoundland, British North America.
Whim	United Kingdom	The ship was driven ashore at St. John's, Newfoundland.

=== 27 December ===
List of shipwrecks: 27 December 1813
Ship	State	Description
Pacific	United Kingdom	The ship ran aground near Bermuda. Her crew were rescued. She was on a voyage from Halifax, Nova Scotia, British North America to Barbados.

=== 29 December ===
List of shipwrecks: 29 December 1813
Ship	State	Description
Minerva	United Kingdom	The ship departed from São Miguel Island, Azores for London. No further trace, presumed foundered with the loss of all hands.
Unnamed	United Kingdom	The Norfolk wherry sprang a leak and sank in the River Yare at Thorpe St Andrew, Norfolk. She was on a voyage from Great Yarmouth to Norwich.

=== 30 December ===
List of shipwrecks: 30 December 1813
Ship	State	Description
USS Chippewa	United States Navy	War of 1812: Battle of Buffalo:The Sloop was burned by the British on the 29th or 30th at Black Rock, New York.
USS Little Belt	United States Navy	War of 1812: Battle of Buffalo:The Sloop was burned by the British on the 29th or 30th at Black Rock, New York.

=== Unknown date ===
List of shipwrecks: Unknown date in December 1813
Ship	State	Description
Adventure	United Kingdom	The ship was lost off Cape Breton, Landes, France. Her crew survived but were taken prisoner.
Anna	United Kingdom	The ship was lost near Arkhangelsk, Russia.
Antoinette	United States	War of 1812: The ship was driven ashore in the Basque Roads by HMS Royalist (Royal Navy). She was on a voyage from Philadelphia, Pennsylvania to Bordeaux, Gironde, France. Antoinette was later refloated and taken in to Plymouth, Devon, United Kingdom.
August and Eleonora	United Kingdom	The ship foundered with the loss of all hands whilst on a voyage from Elbing to London.
Aurora	United Kingdom	War of the Sixth Coalition: The ship was captured and sunk by Circé and Pallas (both French Navy) between 4 and 16 December. She was on a voyage from Dover, Kent to San Sebastián, Spain.
Brilliant	United Kingdom	War of the Sixth Coalition: The ship was captured by Circé and Pallas (both French Navy after 5 December. She was discovered abandoned by HMS Hyperion (Royal Navy) and taken in to Plymouth, Devon, where she arrived on 20 December. Brilliant was on a voyage from Maranhão, Brazil to London.
Campton	United Kingdom	The ship sank at Scarborough, Yorkshire.
Catherina Elizabeth	Sweden	The ship ran aground on Götaland. She was on a voyage from St. Ubes, Portugal to Stockholm.
Centurion	United Kingdom	The ship was lost on North Uist, Outer Hebrides. Her crew were rescued. She was on a voyage from Pictou, Nova Scotia, British North America to Leith, Lothian.
Ceres	United Kingdom	The transport ship was driven ashore and wrecked at A Coruña, Spain between 1 and 3 December.
Confianza	Spain	War of the Sixth Coalition: The ship was captured and burnt by Sultane (French Navy). She was on a voyage from Cádiz to Wilmington, Delaware, United States.
Content	United Kingdom	The ship was lost on the Gunfleet Sand, in the North Sea off the coat of Essex.
Doubt	United Kingdom	War of the Sixth Coalition: The ship was captured by the French and was subsequently lost on the French coast.
Einegheten	Sweden	The ship was driven ashore near Karlskrona. She was on a voyage from Stockholm to Topsham, Devon. She was refloated and taken in to Gothenburgh.<
Essex	United Kingdom	The ship ran aground on The Holmes. She was on a voyage from Cádiz, Spain to Bristol, Gloucestershire. She was refloated and taken in to Milford Haven, Pembrokeshire.
Fame	United Kingdom	War of the Sixth Coalition: The ship was captured and sunk by the privateer Junon (France) before 8 December.
Favourite	United Kingdom	The ship was captured by a privateer but was abandoned in a waterlogged state and presumed to have foundered. She was on a voyage from Königsberg, Prussia to London.
Fox	United Kingdom	The ship foundered in the Atlantic Ocean. She was on a voyage from Prince Edward Island, British North America to Liverpool, Lancashire. Her crew were rescued by HMS Nemesis (Royal Navy.
Fox	United Kingdom	War of the Sixth Coalition: The ship was captured and sunk by Circé and Pallas (both French Navy) between 4 and 16 December. She was on a voyage from Malta to London.
George	United Kingdom	The ship was wrecked at Den Helder, North Holland, Netherlands. She was on a voyage from Arkhangelsk to London.
Highlander	United Kingdom	War of 1812: The ship was captured and burnt by the privateer Saucy Jack (United States). She was on a voyage from Kingston, Jamaica to Cuba.
Hope	United Kingdom	The ship foundered in the North Sea. She was on a voyage from Gothenburg, Sweden to Perth.
John	United Kingdom	War of the Sixth Coalition: The ship was captured by the French and was subsequently lost on the French coast.
Laura	United Kingdom	The ship foundered in the Baltic Sea. She was on a voyage from Uleåborg, Sweden to an English port.
Lightning	United Kingdom	War of the Sixth Coalition: The ship was captured and sunk by Circé and Pallas (both French Navy) between 4 and 16 December. She was on a voyage from São Miguel, Azores, Portugal to London.
Maria	United Kingdom	The ship was lost at Villafranca, Spain. Her crew were rescued. She was on a voyage from Gibraltar to Cork.
Mary Ann	United Kingdom	The ship was wrecked in the River Plate. She was on a voyage from London to Buenos Aires.
Neptune	United Kingdom	The ship foundered in the Irish Sea off Dungarvan, County Waterford with the loss of five of her ten crew. She was on a voyage from Bristol, Gloucestershire to Cork.
Neptunus	United Kingdom	The ship foundered with the loss of all hands. She was on a voyage from Leith, Lothian to Wismar.
Nimrod	United Kingdom	The ship sprang a leak and foundered in the English Channel off Dungeness, Kent. Her crew were rescued. She was on a voyage from Portsmouth, Hampshire to Whitby, Yorkshire.
Orion	United Kingdom	The brig foundered whilst on a voyage from Málaga, Spain to Falmouth, Cornwall. Her crew were rescued by Shellelagh (United Kingdom).
Perseverance	United Kingdom	The ship was wrecked at sea before 7 December. She was on a voyage from Mahón, Spain to London.
Progress	United Kingdom	The ship was driven ashore on Saaremaa, Russia and wrecked. Her crew were rescued. She was on a voyage from Saint Petersburg to London.
Río Miñho	Portugal	The schooner foundered in the Atlantic Ocean. Her crew were rescued by Coriolanus (United Kingdom).
Samuel	United Kingdom	The ship was driven ashore near Fontarabia, Spain. She was refloated.
Saree Marie	Sweden	The ship was driven ashore on the west coast of Bermuda.
Schwager	Prussia	The ship was driven ashore at Great Yarmouth, Norfolk, United Kingdom. She was on a voyage from Memel to London, United Kingdom. Schwager was refloated on 18 December and taken in to Great Yarmouth.
Southern Packet	United Kingdom	The ship was driven ashore and wrecked at "St. Marys". She was on a voyage from Buenos Aires to Rio de Janeiro.
Speculation	United Kingdom	The ship was driven ashore near Falkenberg, Sweden. She was on a voyage from Stockholm, Sweden to London.
St Joachim	Russia	The ship was driven ashore near Baltic Port. She was on a voyage from Saint Petersburg to London.
Symmetry	United Kingdom	The ship was wrecked on the Lemon and Ore Sand, in the North Sea. She was on a voyage from Saint Petersburg, Russia to London.
Tredigar	United Kingdom	The ship was driven ashore near Cork. She was on a voyage from Liverpool to Cork.
Two Brothers	(United Kingdom of Great Britain and Ireland) Guernsey	War of the Sixth Coalition: The ship was captured and sunk by the privateer Junon (France before 8 December.
Two Friends	United Kingdom	War of the Sixth Coalition: The ship was captured and sunk by Circé and Pallas (both French Navy) between 4 and 16 December. She was on a voyage from Gibraltar to London.
William Pitt	British East India Company	The East Indiaman was wrecked in Algoa Bay around 16 December.
Ten unnamed vessels	United Kingdom	The ships were wrecked between Mimizan, Landes and Bayonne, Pyrénées-Atlantiques, France before 10 December.

== Unknown date ==
List of shipwrecks: Unknown date in 1813
Ship	State	Description
Agreeable	United Kingdom	{{{desc}}}
Apollo	United Kingdom	The ship sprang a leak and was abandoned in the Atlantic Ocean. Her crew were rescued by Tom (United Kingdom).
Birnie	United Kingdom	The whaler was lost in the Davis Straits. Her crew were rescued.
Brazil Packet	Portugal	War of the Sixth Coalition: The ship was captured and destroyed by "Modeste" and Nymphe (both French Navy) on 27 or 29 December. She was on a voyage from Madeira to Brazil.
Britannia	United Kingdom	The ship was wrecked at Saint Kitts. She was on a voyage from Demerara to a British port.
Charles	United Kingdom	The ship was lost off the mouth of the Gambia River, Africa with the loss of two lives. She was on a voyage from London to Sierra Leone.
Druid, alias Princess of Asturias	United Kingdom	The ship was lost whilst on a voyage from Lima, Viceroyalty of Peru to London.
Earl Percy	United Kingdom	War of 1812: The ship was captured by USS Chesapeake (United States Navy). She was subsequently driven ashore on Long Island, New York, United States. Earl Percy was on a voyage from the Cape Verde Islands to Brazil.
Eliza	United Kingdom	The transport ship was driven ashore and severely damaged at Alexandria, Egypt. She was later refloated.
Elizabeth	United Kingdom	War of 1812: The ship was captured by the privateer Saucy Jack (United States) whilst on a voyage from Cap-François to an English port. She was set afire and sunk.
Endeavour	(United Kingdom of Great Britain and Ireland) Saint Vincent	War of 1812: The ship was captured by the privateer Patriot (United States). She was set afire and sunk.
Flora	United Kingdom	War of the Sixth Coalition: The ship was captured and destroyed by "Modeste" and Nymphe (both French Navy) on 27 or 29 December. She was on a voyage from London to Martinique.
Flying Fish	(United Kingdom of Great Britain and Ireland) Nevis	War of 1812: The sloop was captured by the privateer Jacks Favourite (United States). She was set afire and sunk.
Flying Fish	(United Kingdom of Great Britain and Ireland) Jamaica	War of 1812: The ship was captured by the privateer Saucy Jack (United States). She was set afire and sunk.
Four Brothers	(United Kingdom of Great Britain and Ireland) Grenada	The ship was driven ashore and wrecked on Grenada.
Gallinipper	United States	War of 1812: The privateer was chased ashore by HMS Rattler (Royal Navy) and was burnt.
General Hunter	United Kingdom	The ship was lost at Martinique. She was on a voyage from Saint John, New Brunswick, British North America, to the West Indies.
Governor Wentworth	United Kingdom	The ship was wrecked on the coast of the Cape Colony.
Gute Erwagting	Russia	The ship foundered in the Gulf of Finland. She was on a voyage from London to Saint Petersburg.
Helen	United Kingdom	The ship was lost whilst on a voyage from the Clyde to Newfoundland.
Hellen	United Kingdom	War of 1812: The ship was captured and burnt in the Gulf of Saint Lawrence by an American privateer.
Herald	United Kingdom	The ship capsized and sank with the loss of a crew member. She was on a voyage from New Brunswick, British North America to the West Indies.
Hero	United Kingdom	The ship was driven ashore at Madeira. She was on a voyage from London to the Cape of Good Hope. She was refloated in January and sailed on the 25th for Lisbon, Portugal to be repaired. Subsequently put into Lanzarote, Canary Islands.
Holkar	United States	War of 1812: The privateer was driven ashore in Long Island Sound and was destroyed by HMS Orpheus (Royal Navy).
Integrity	United Kingdom	The ship was sunk by ice in the Grand Banks of Newfoundland. She was on a voyage from Liverpool, Lancashire to Newfoundland, British North America.
Invincible Napoleon	France	War of the Sixth Coalition: The privateer was captured by HMS Mutine (Royal Navy). She was recaptured by the privateer Alexander (United States) but was then driven ashore near Cape Ann, Massachusetts, United States by HMS Shannon and HMS Tenedos (both Royal Navy) and was captured. Invincible Napoleon was refloated and taken in to Halifax, Nova Scotia, British North America.
Jane and Sally	United Kingdom	The ship was wrecked on Tino, French Empire with the loss of all hands. She was on a voyage from London to Smyrna, Greece.
John	United Kingdom	The ship was wrecked at St. John's, Newfoundland, British North America.
Juliana	United Kingdom	The ship was destroyed by fire off Palermo, Sicily.
Kate	(United Kingdom of Great Britain and Ireland) Bermuda	War of 1812: The schooner was captured by the privateer Saucy Jack (United States) whilst on a voyage from Bermuda to Jamaica. She was set afire and sunk.
Lady Caroline Barham	United Kingdom	War of the Sixth Coalition: The ship was captured and destroyed by "Modeste" and Nymphe (both French Navy) on 27 or 29 December. She was on a voyage from London to Jamaica.
Latona	United Kingdom	The whaler was sunk by ice off the coast of Greenland. Her crew were rescued.
Laurel	United Kingdom	The whaler was crushed by ice and sank off the coast of Greenland. Her crew were rescued.
Louisa	United Kingdom	War of 1812: The full-rigged ship was captured and burnt by the privateer Saucy Jack (United States). She was on a voyage from Cap François, Haiti to an English port.
Maria and Francisca	Hamburg	The ship was lost off the coast of Essex, United Kingdom. She was on a voyage from Hamburg to Puerto Rico.
Mayflower	United Kingdom	The ship was wrecked on the coast of Labrador, British North America. There were some survivors. She was on a voyage from Quebec City, Lower Canada to London.
Phosphorus	United Kingdom	The brig was lost during 1813.
Potsdam	United Kingdom	War of the Sixth Coalition: The ship was captured and destroyed by "Modeste" and Nymphe (both French Navy) on 27 or 29 December. She was on a voyage from London to Jamaica.
Rosalia	United Kingdom	The ship ran aground on the Nash Sands, in the Bristol Channel with the loss of three of her twelve crew.
Rosario	Portugal	War of the Sixth Coalition: The ship was captured and destroyed by "Modeste" and Nymphe (both French Navy) on 27 or 29 December. She was on a voyage from the Cape Verde Islands to Brazil.
Sally	United Kingdom	The ship foundered whilst on a voyage from Belfast, County Antrim to Newfoundland. Her crew were rescued.
Salvador	Spain	The ship was wrecked at Maldonado, Brazil with the loss of about 700 lives. There were about 150 survivors. Salvador was on a voyage from Cádiz to Montevideo.
Sarah	United Kingdom	The ship was wreck at Saint-Domingue.
Sir Alexander Cochrane	United Kingdom	The ship was driven ashore at Island Harbour, Fogo Island, Newfoundland British North America.
Tartar	United Kingdom	War of 1812: The ship was captured by the privateer General Armstrong (United States). She was subsequently lost near George Town. Tartar was on a voyage from Saint Barthélemy to Guernsey, Channel Islands.
Thetis	Portugal	War of the Sixth Coalition: The ship was captured and destroyed by "Modeste" and Nymphe (both French Navy) on 27 or 29 December. She was on a voyage from the Cape Verde Islands to Brazil.
Thistle	Flag unknown	The vessel was lost in the vicinity of "Squan Inlet," perhaps a reference to Manasquan Inlet on the coast of New Jersey. At the time, the terms "Squan" and "Squan Beach" were used for the coast of New Jersey near Manasquan and sometimes for the 7-mile (11 km) stretch of coast between Manasquan Inlet and Cranberry Inlet or for the entire coast of New Jersey between Sea Girt and Barnegat Inlet, and "Squan Inlet" could have been anywhere in that area.
Two Brothers	(United Kingdom of Great Britain and Ireland) Bermuda	War of 1812: The schooner was captured by the privateer Saucy Jack (United States). She was set afire and sunk.
Venus	United Kingdom	The ship was driven ashore and wrecked on Anticosti Island, Lower Canada, British North America. Her crew were rescued. She was on a voyage from Quebec City to Aberdeen.
Venus	United Kingdom	The ship was wrecked at Great Yarmouth, Norfolk during the summer. Her seven crew were rescued by rocket apparatus.
Six unnamed vessels	Imperial Russian Navy	War of the Sixth Coalition: Five gunboats were driven ashore at the Vistula Spit and one at Danzig.
