= Figueres (disambiguation) =

Figueres is a town in Catalonia, Spain.

Figueres may also refer to:

== Football clubs ==
- FE Figueres, a Spanish football club, playing in the Primera Catalana
- UE Figueres, a Spanish football club, playing in the Divisiones Regionales de Fútbol

== People ==
- José Figueres Ferrer (1906–1990) was a military, politician, and three times president of Costa Rica (1948–1949, 1953–1958, and 1970–1974)
- José María Figueres Olsen (1954-), son of José Figueres Ferrer, also president of Costa Rica (1994–1998)
- Christiana Figueres, daughter of José Figueres Ferrer, a diplomat

== Other uses ==
- Figueres onion, an onion cultivar named after the town

== See also ==
- Figueras (disambiguation)
