= 2027 Murcian regional election =

Election in the Spanish region of Murcia

- 23 May 2027

All 45 seats in the Regional Assembly of Murcia 23 seats needed for a majority
- Opinion polls
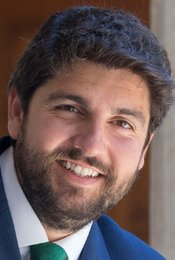

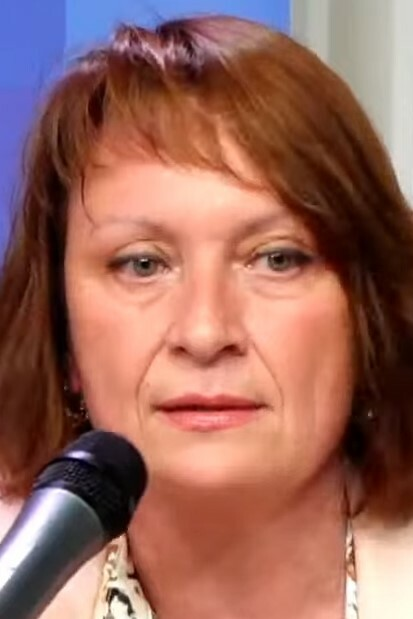
Leader	Fernando López Miras	Francisco Lucas Ayala	Rubén Martínez
Party	PP	PSOE	Vox
Leader since	3 May 2017	19 January 2025	3 March 2026
Last election	21 seats, 42.8%	13 seats, 25.6%	9 seats, 17.7%
Current seats	21	13	7
Seats needed	▲2	▲10	▲16
Leader	María Marín
Party	Podemos–IU–AV
Leader since	18 January 2023
Last election	2 seats, 4.7%
Current seats	2
Seats needed	▲21
Incumbent President
Fernando López Miras
PP

A regional election will be held in the Region of Murcia on 23 May 2027 to elect the 12th Regional Assembly of the autonomous community. All 45 seats in the Regional Assembly will be up for election. It will be held concurrently with regional elections in at least six other autonomous communities and local elections all across Spain.

== Overview ==
=== Electoral system ===
The Regional Assembly of Murcia is the devolved, unicameral legislature of the autonomous community of Murcia, having legislative power in regional matters as defined by the Spanish Constitution and the Murcian Statute of Autonomy, as well as the ability to vote confidence in or withdraw it from a regional president. Voting for the Regional Assembly is on the basis of universal suffrage, which comprises all nationals over 18 years of age, registered in the Region of Murcia and in full enjoyment of their political rights.

The 45 members of the Regional Assembly of Murcia are elected using the D'Hondt method and a closed list proportional representation, with an electoral threshold of three percent of valid votes—which includes blank ballots—being applied regionally.

=== Election date ===
The term of the Regional Assembly of Murcia expires four years after the date of its previous election. Elections to the Regional Assembly are fixed for the fourth Sunday of May every four years. The previous election was held on 28 May 2023, setting the election date for the Regional Assembly on 23 May 2027.

The president has the prerogative to dissolve the Regional Assembly of Murcia and call a snap election, provided that no motion of no confidence is in process, no nationwide election is due and some time requirements are met: namely, that dissolution does not occur either during the first legislative session or within the legislature's last year ahead of its scheduled expiry, nor before one year has elapsed since a previous dissolution under this procedure. In the event of an investiture process failing to elect a regional president within a two-month period from the first ballot, the Regional Assembly shall be automatically dissolved and a fresh election called. Any snap election held as a result of these circumstances will not alter the period to the next ordinary election, with elected lawmakers serving the remainder of its original four-year term.

== Parliamentary composition ==
The table below shows the composition of the parliamentary groups in the Regional Assembly at the present time.

Current parliamentary composition
Groups	Parties	Legislators	
Groups	Parties	Seats	Total
People's Parliamentary Group	PP	21	21
Socialist Parliamentary Group	PSOE	13	13
Vox Parliamentary Group	Vox	7	7
Mixed Group	Podemos	2	4
Mixed Group	INDEP	2 (Note: José Ángel Antelo and Virginia Martínez, former Vox legislators.)	4

== Parties and candidates ==
The electoral law allows for parties and federations registered in the interior ministry, coalitions and groupings of electors to present lists of candidates. Parties and federations intending to form a coalition ahead of an election are required to inform the relevant Electoral Commission within ten days of the election call, whereas groupings of electors need to secure the signature of at least one percent of the electorate in the Region of Murcia, disallowing electors from signing for more than one list of candidates.

Below is a list of the main parties and electoral alliances which will likely contest the election:

Candidacy	Parties and alliances	Leading candidate	Ideology	Previous result		Gov.	Ref.
Candidacy	Parties and alliances	Leading candidate	Ideology	Vote %	Seats	Gov.	Ref.
PP	List: People's Party (PP)	Fernando López Miras	Conservatism; Christian democracy	42.8%	21	Yes	
PSOE	List: Spanish Socialist Workers' Party (PSOE)	Francisco Lucas Ayala	Social democracy	25.6%	13	No	
Vox	List: Vox (Vox)	Rubén Martínez	Right-wing populism Ultranationalism; National conservatism	17.7%	9	No	
Podemos– IU–AV	List: We Can (Podemos); United Left–Greens of the Region of Murcia (IU–V–RM) – Communist Party of the Region of Murcia (PCM) – Ecosocialists of the Region of Murcia (ESRM) – The Dawn Marxist Organization (La Aurora (OM)) – Republican Left (IR); Green Alliance (AV)	María Marín	Left-wing populism Direct democracy Democratic socialism	4.7%	2	No	

== Opinion polls ==
The tables below list opinion polling results in reverse chronological order, showing the most recent first and using the dates when the survey fieldwork was done, as opposed to the date of publication. Where the fieldwork dates are unknown, the date of publication is given instead. The highest percentage figure in each polling survey is displayed with its background shaded in the leading party's colour. If a tie ensues, this is applied to the figures with the highest percentages. The "Lead" column on the right shows the percentage-point difference between the parties with the highest percentages in a poll.

=== Graphical summary ===
Local regression trend line of poll results from 28 May 2023 to the present day, with each line corresponding to a political party.

=== Voting intention estimates ===
The table below lists weighted voting intention estimates. Refusals are generally excluded from the party vote percentages, while question wording and the treatment of "don't know" responses and those not intending to vote may vary between polling organisations. When available, seat projections determined by the polling organisations are displayed below (or in place of) the percentages in a smaller font; 23 seats are required for an absolute majority in the Regional Assembly of Murcia.

Polling firm/Commissioner	Fieldwork date	Sample size	Turnout	PP	PSOE	Vox	Podemos	MCC	Sumar	SALF	Lead
CEMOP	1–17 Sep 2026	821	63.8	43.1; 21/22	17.7; 9/10	25.4; 12	5.3; 2	–	–	–	17.7
Sigma Dos/El Mundo	22–29 May 2026	1,180	?	43.5; 21/22	24.0; 11/12	18.8; 9	6.1; 2/3	–	–	–	19.5
Sigma Dos/La 7	18–21 May 2026	1,000	?	? 21/22	? 12/13	? 9/10	? 2/3	–	–	2.7; 0	?
OBEDE/UCAM	13–28 Apr 2026	800	62.5	43.8; 21/22	24.5; 12	23.0; 11	2.9; 0/1	–	–	–	19.3
CEMOP	20 Jan–6 Feb 2026	820	65.5	37.7; 19	24.1; 12	25.7; 12	4.3; 2	–	–	–	12.0
OBEDE/UCAM	18–28 Nov 2025	800	58.1	37.6; 19	23.3; 11	27.2; 13	–	–	4.1; 2	–	10.4
CEMOP	3–21 Nov 2025	820	64.8	38.3; 19	23.9; 12	25.3; 12	5.5; 2	–	–	–	13.0
EM-Analytics/Electomanía	30 Aug–28 Sep 2025	1,310	?	43.3; 21	31.1; 15	15.4; 7	1.5; 0	1.3; 0	5.6; 2	–	12.2
CEMOP	1–12 Sep 2025	820	63.6	36.1; 18	25.8; 12	27.9; 13	5.6; 2	–	–	–	8.2
Sigma Dos/El Mundo	26 Apr–5 Jun 2025	1,072	?	43.8; 21/22	26.5; 13/14	17.5; 8/9	4.5; 1/2	–	–	–	17.3
NC Report/La Razón	16–31 May 2025	350	?	? 24	? 12	? 9	–	–	–	–	?
SyM Consulting	16–19 Apr 2025	1,000	52.0	41.0; 19/20	26.4; 12/13	23.4; 11	4.3; 2	1.6; 0	–	–	14.6
CEMOP	24 Mar–4 Apr 2025	820	61.9	42.8; 21	24.5; 12	22.4; 10	4.1; 2	–	–	–	18.3
EM-Analytics/Electomanía	28 Nov–28 Dec 2024	1,310	?	42.1; 21	31.3; 16	13.8; 7	2.1; 0	2.2; 0	3.3; 1	–	10.8
CEMOP	25 Nov–11 Dec 2024	820	60.1	46.6; 23	23.9; 11	20.7; 10	3.1; 1	–	–	–	22.7
OBEDE/UCAM	15–29 Nov 2024	800	60.2	46.3; 23	23.3; 12	19.6; 10	–	–	–	–	23.0
SyM Consulting	15–19 Oct 2024	1,000	61.4	45.4; 22	25.8; 12/13	19.5; 9	4.0; 1/2	2.6; 0	–	–	19.6
CEMOP	23 Sep–4 Oct 2024	820	62.4	44.1; 22	24.9; 12	18.8; 9	5.1; 2	–	–	–	19.2
Sigma Dos/La 7	2–11 Sep 2024	1,004	?	46.8; 22/23	26.6; 12/13	16.3; 7/8	4.3; 1/2	–	–	3.1; 0/1	20.2
Data10/OKDiario	15–16 Jul 2024	1,500	?	46.6; 23	27.7; 14	14.2; 7	3.4; 1	–	–	–	18.9
NC Report/La Razón	13–16 Jul 2024	1,000	64.2	47.0; 24	23.8; 12	15.9; 8	3.1; 1	–	–	–	23.2
2024 EP election	9 Jun 2024	—N/a	46.8	42.9 (21)	25.1 (12)	15.9 (8)	2.4 (0)	–	3.3 (1)	6.6 (3)	17.8
CEMOP	20–30 May 2024	820	63.4	46.1; 22	26.9; 13	17.9; 8	4.7; 2	–	–	–	19.2
CEMOP	5–22 Mar 2024	818	62.7	47.7; 23	24.3; 12	16.7; 8	5.4; 2	–	–	–	23.4
CEMOP	11–22 Jan 2024	817	63.8	41.8; 21	24.8; 12	20.4; 10	5.1; 2	–	–	–	17.0
2023 general election	23 Jul 2023	—N/a	70.8	41.2 (19)	25.3 (12)	21.8 (10)	(Note: Within Sumar.)	–	9.5 (4)	–	15.9
CEMOP	3–13 Jul 2023	1,200	68	44.3; 22	25.3; 12/13	17.5; 8/9	5.7; 2	–	–	–	19.0
2023 regional election	28 May 2023	—N/a	63.2	42.8; 21	25.6; 13	17.7; 9	4.7; 2	3.0; 0	–	–	17.2

=== Voting preferences ===
The table below lists raw, unweighted voting preferences.

Polling firm/Commissioner	Fieldwork date	Sample size	PP	PSOE	Vox	Podemos	Sumar	SALF	Question	X mark	Lead
CEMOP	1–17 Sep 2026	821	25.1	8.9	15.0	2.8	–	–	22.2	17.5	10.1
CEMOP	20 Jan–6 Feb 2026	820	24.9	14.6	20.3	3.2	–	–	18.8	6.8	4.6
CEMOP	3–21 Nov 2025	820	22.7	15.9	17.5	3.9	–	–	17.3	12.0	5.2
CEMOP	1–12 Sep 2025	820	22.0	16.2	18.2	4.0	–	–	18.5	12.5	3.8
CEMOP	24 Mar–4 Apr 2025	820	21.3	15.0	12.3	2.6	–	–	26.3	13.8	6.3
CIS	7–31 Mar 2025	256	34.0	29.4	11.0	1.5	1.7	–	17.0	3.3	4.6
CEMOP	25 Nov–11 Dec 2024	820	28.8	9.5	11.8	1.6	–	–	24.6	17.1	17.0
CEMOP	23 Sep–4 Oct 2024	820	24.5	13.4	14.7	3.0	–	–	23.5	14.0	9.8
2024 EP election	9 Jun 2024	—N/a	20.6	12.0	7.6	1.1	1.6	3.2	—N/a	51.7	8.6
CEMOP	20–30 May 2024	820	32.6	16.7	14.1	4.6	–	–	19.0	9.3	15.9
CEMOP	5–22 Mar 2024	818	28.9	11.7	9.3	4.0	–	–	24.9	16.7	17.2
CEMOP	11–22 Jan 2024	817	28.8	13.0	13.5	2.7	–	–	21.8	13.7	15.3
2023 general election	23 Jul 2023	—N/a	28.9	17.7	15.3		6.7	–	—N/a	29.2	10.9
CEMOP	3–13 Jul 2023	1,200	35.0	20.7	17.8	5.3	–	–	10.6	5.4	14.3
2023 regional election	28 May 2023	—N/a	27.2	16.3	11.3	3.0	–	–	—N/a	34.3	10.9

=== Preferred President ===
The table below lists opinion polling on leader preferences to become president of the Region of Murcia.

Polling firm/Commissioner	Fieldwork date	Sample size					Other/ None/ Not care	Question	Lead
Polling firm/Commissioner	Fieldwork date	Sample size	L. Miras PP	Ayala PSOE	Antelo Vox	Marín Podemos	Other/ None/ Not care	Question	Lead
CIS (Note: Responses denoting a party's generic candidate are aggregated to that party's main candidate/leader at the time of the poll.)	7–31 Mar 2025	256	34.1	19.6	7.1	1.1	3.5	34.5	14.5
