= Bomba rice =

Type of rice

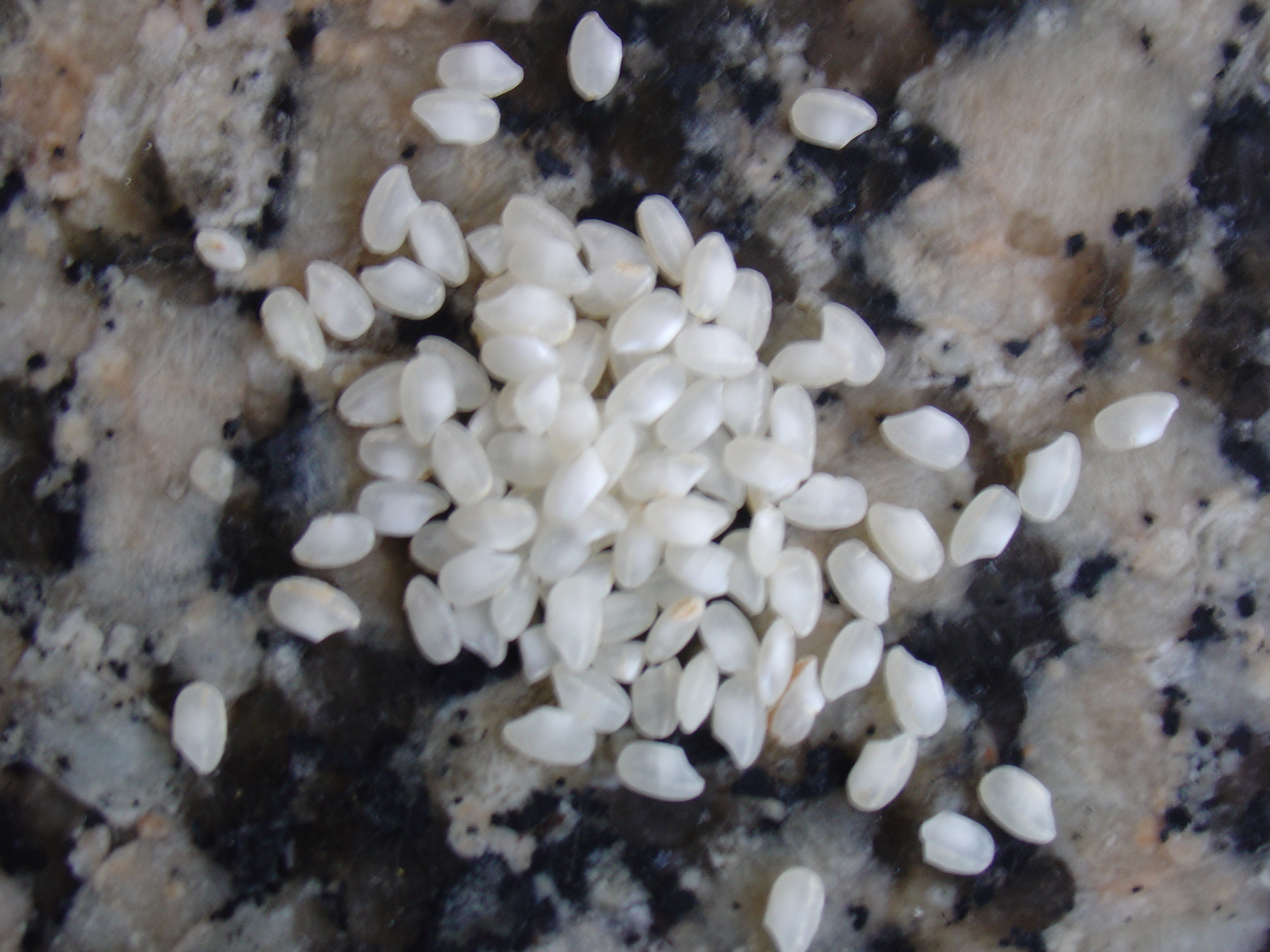
Arroz de Calasparra, showing the characteristic near-spherical grains of bomba rice

Bomba rice (Spanish: arroz bomba; Valencian: arròs bomba) is a short-grain variety of rice (Oryza sativa L.), primarily cultivated in the eastern parts of Spain. It is commonly used in paella and other dishes in Valencian cuisine, and is often referred to as Valencia rice. Bomba is considered a short to medium grain variety of rice, but unlike other short grain varieties, it has a relatively low content of Amylopectin, meaning it does not become sticky when cooked (like Sushi rice) nor does it thicken the cooking fluid (like Arborio rice).

== Characteristics ==
Bomba rice is believed to have originated from an Indian variety which was brought to the Iberian Peninsula via the Middle East. It is known for its nonstick properties due to its high amylose content. It is short grained with a pearly white color and a uniform consistency. One important property of bomba is its ability to absorb two or three times its volume in water without bursting. As a result, more water is needed to cook bomba than other similar varieties, and the grains of rice tend to hold their structure well after cooking. Bomba is one of the most expensive varieties of rice from Spain, especially the Denominación de Origen (D.O.) varieties from Calasparra and Moratalla. Other well-known regions for bomba rice include Silla, Pego and Pals with Pals Rice.

== See also ==
- Arborio rice
- Calasparra rice — also with D.O. status
- Ebro Delta — also with D.O. status
