= Deltebre I =

Archaeological site

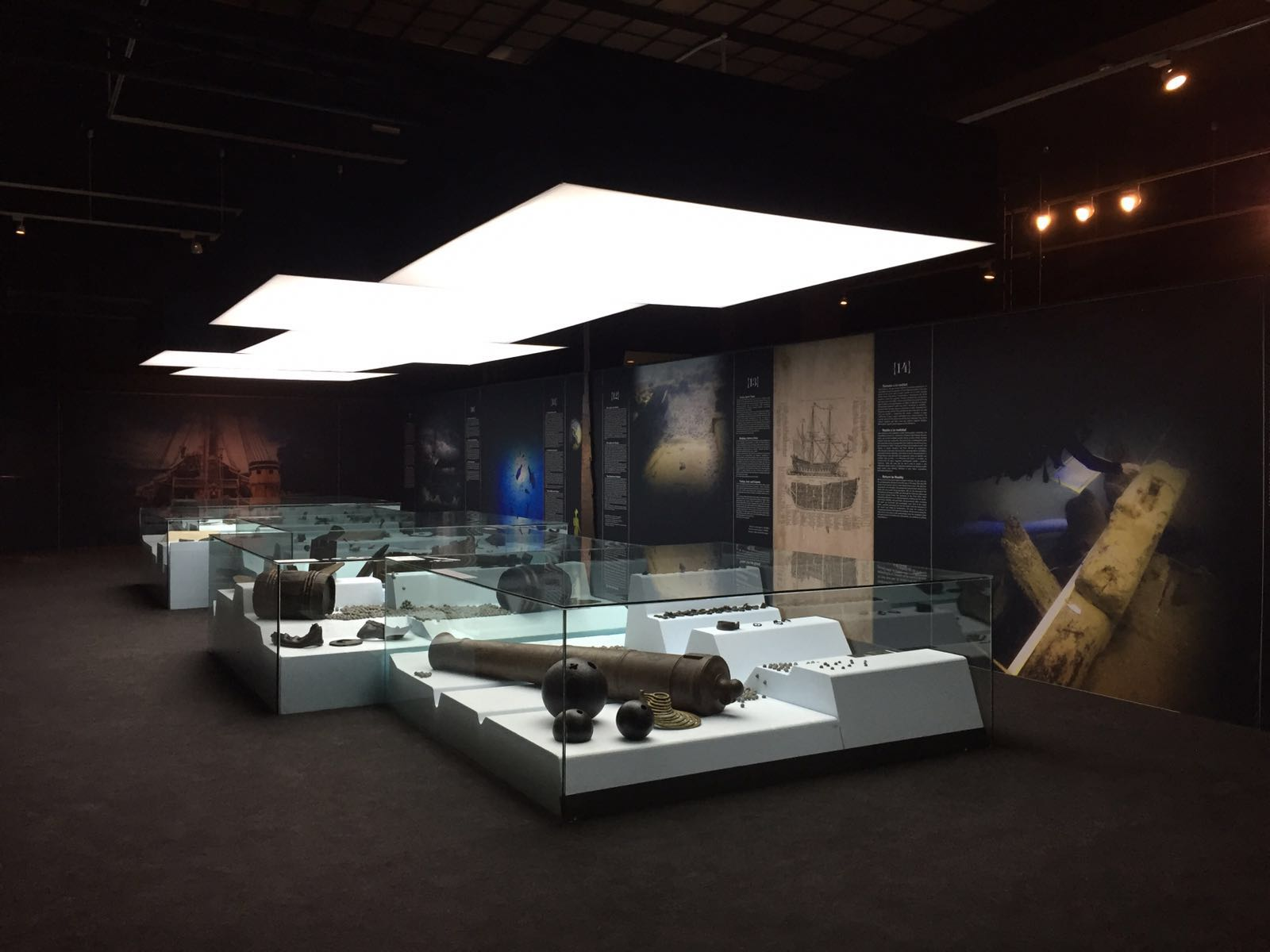
Deltebre I

Deltebre I is an archaeological site of a shipwreck belonging to a British army transport fleet which sank in the Ebro Delta with other ships of the same convoy in the summer of 1813. The lost ships were the Alfred, the Harlequin, the Magnum, and the Bonum Southampton.

== See also ==
- List of shipwrecks in 1813
