= José Vélez (disambiguation) =

José Vélez (born 1951) is a Spanish singer.

José Vélez may also refer to:

- José A. Vélez Jr. (born 1963), Puerto Rican jockey
- Ñoño (born 1983), full name José Antonio Vélez Jiménez, Spanish footballer
- José Vélez (politician) (born 1966), Spanish politician
