= José Vélez (politician) =

Spanish politician

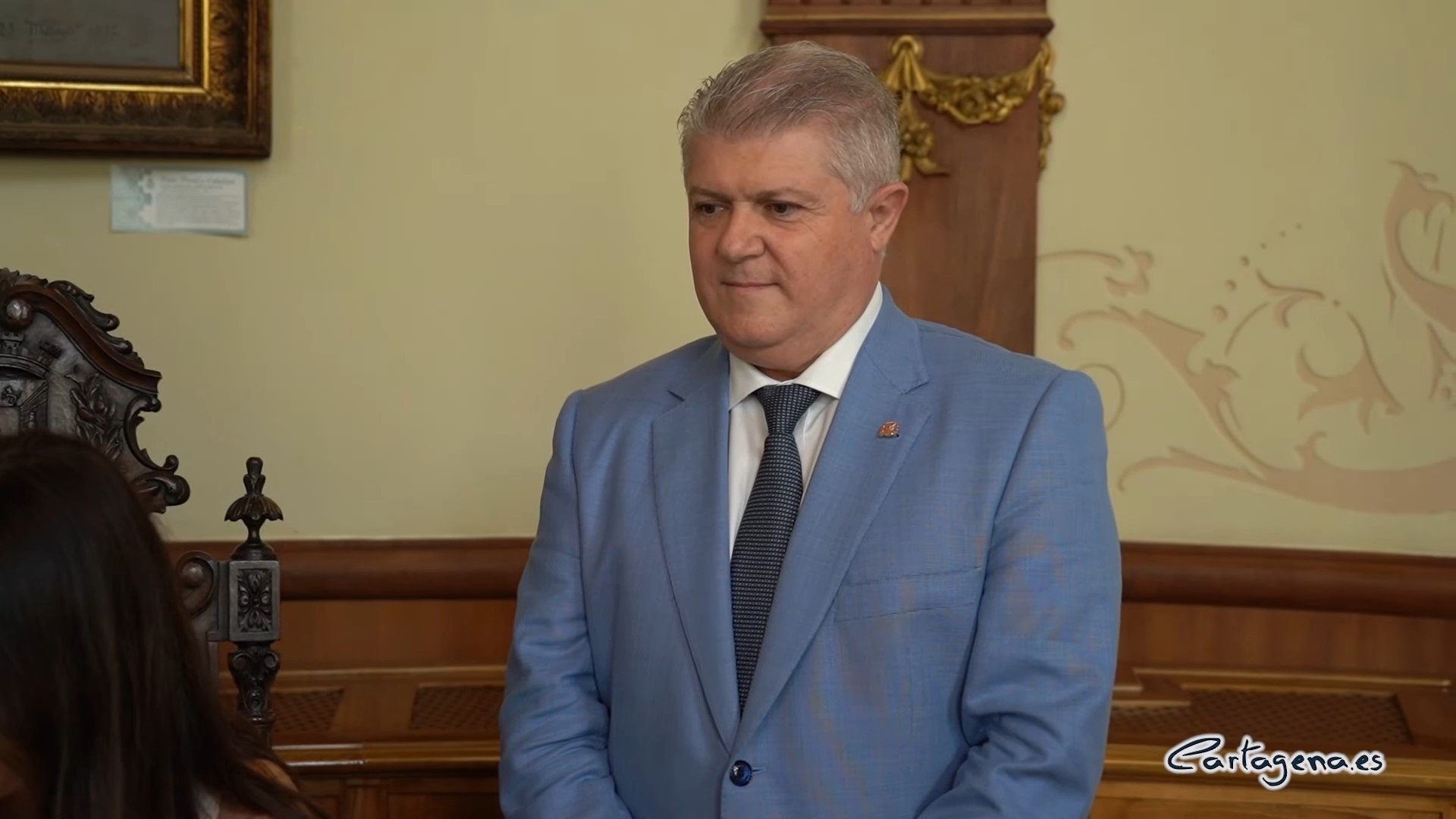
José Vélez in 2022

José Vélez Fernández (born 1966) is a Spanish Socialist Workers' Party (PSOE) politician. He was a member of the council in Calasparra in the Region of Murcia from 1999 to 2020, and its mayor from 2014. Elected secretary general of the Socialist Party of the Region of Murcia (PSRM) in 2021, he led the party in the 2023 Murcian regional election. He resigned his party leadership at the end of 2024 and his seat in the Regional Assembly of Murcia the following year.

== Biography ==
Born in Calasparra, Region of Murcia, Vélez graduated in Labour Relations and Human Resources from the University of Murcia. He then became a member of the management board at the Murcian Health Service.

Vélez was voted onto his hometown's council in 1999. In October 2014, he was elected mayor after the resignation of Jesús Navarro due to poor approval ratings. He renewed his mandate in 2015 and 2019, and resigned in February 2020 when named the Government Delegate for the region.

In November 2021, Vélez was voted secretary general of the Socialist Party of the Region of Murcia (PSRM) with 2,867 votes, compared to 567 for former regional minister Lourdes Retuerto. In the 2023 Murcian regional election, his party lost four seats in the Regional Assembly of Murcia as Fernando López Miras of the People's Party (PP) remained President of the Region of Murcia. Later that year, he turned down a nomination to the Senate of Spain to keep his place in the regional assembly.

In December 2024, Vélez announced that he would not run for re-election as secretary general of the Socialist Party of the Region of Murcia. On 2 May 2025, he resigned his parliamentary seat for a role in the Murcian Health Service.
