= Calasparra rice =

Variety of rice

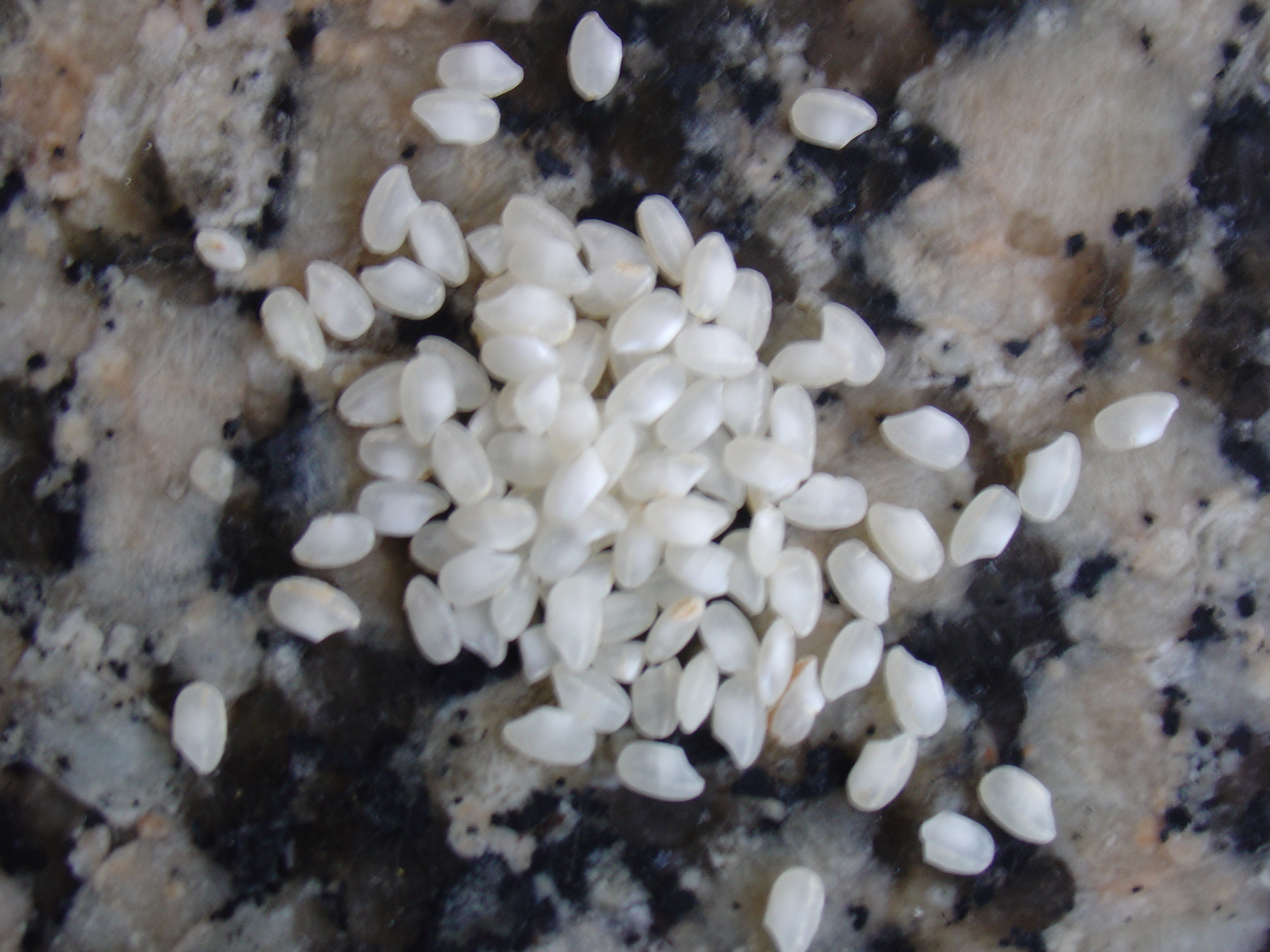
- Genus: Oryza
- Origin: Murcia, Spain

Calasparra rice (Spanish: arroz de Calasparra) is a variety of rice native to the region of Murcia, Spain.

Along with rice produced in Valencia and the Ebro Delta, it is one of three Spanish rices with a Denominación de Origen, since 1986. It is named for the municipality of Calasparra.

Rice cultivation is documented in Murcia dating back to the 14th century, and is thought to have been introduced to the area by Muslim occupiers. The use of terrace irrigation and well-drained soil makes the region ideal for rice cultivation. Calasparra rice is matured longer than other strains of rice, and is exceptionally absorbent, making it well-suited for the preparation of paella.

== See also ==
- Bomba rice — also known as Valencia rice
