= Nembo =

Nembo may refer to:

== Military ==
- 184th Infantry Division "Nembo", a Royal Italian Army unit in World War II
  - 183rd Infantry Regiment "Nembo", a unit of the division, still in existence
  - 185th Infantry Regiment "Nembo", a unit of the division, still in existence
- Other Italian Army units - see List of units of the Italian Army#Paracadutisti
- Nembo-class destroyer, an Italian class of six destroyers built between 1899 and 1905
  - Italian destroyer Nembo (1901), a Nembo-class destroyer launched in 1901 and sunk in 1916
- Italian destroyer Nembo (1927), a Turbine-class destroyer launched in 1927 and sunk in 1940

== Other uses ==
- Neri and Bonacini, also called Nembo, an Italian shop which produced car bodies for Ferrari, Lamborghini and Maserati
- Val Nembo, a valley in the Bergamasque Prealps Italian mountain range
- Nembo, a variety of Pals Rice
- Nembo (Stormcloud), a 1935 play by Massimo Bontempelli
- Nembo Film, a film production company - see Ettore Fieramosca (1938)

== See also ==
- Antonello Riva (born 1962), Italian former basketball player nicknamed "Nembo Kid"
