= Government Delegation (Spain) =

In Spain, a Government Delegation oversees and supervises all services of the central government and its public agencies (collectively known as the General State Administration) within an Autonomous Community. Effectively, they represent the Government in the territory of an Autonomous Community and ensure the governmental services are coordinated with the administration of the Autonomous Community. Delegations also exercise their role through Sub-Delegations, headquartered in the provinces and Insular Directorates, headquartered in some islands.

Government Delegations were established pursuant Section 154 of the Spanish Constitution. The sub-delegations and insular directorates were established in 1997 to replace the civil governors that existed since the beginning of the 19th century. In total, there are 19 government delegations, 44 sub-delegations and 7 insular directorates. All of them are part of the Ministry of Territorial Policy and Democratic Memory.

== Delegations and sub-delegations ==
Government Delegations and Sub-delegations are regulated under the Public Sector Legal System Act of 2015.

=== Government Delegation ===
The Government Delegations are the bodies that represent the central government in the autonomous communities. The principal officer of a Delegation is the Government Delegate. Government Delegates have the rank of Under Secretaries and they report to the Prime Minister, although normally this reporting line is delegated from the Prime Minister to the Minister for Territorial Policy or, the Secretary of State for Territorial Policy. They are appointed by the Council of Ministers at the request of the Premier. If the office of Delegate is vacant, they are replaced by the Sub-delegate until a new Delegate is appointed. In the regions with a sole province, if there is no sub-delegate the Secretary-General of the delegation temporarily assumes office.

Unlike the sub-delegations and insular directorates, Government Delegations are provided for in the constitution. The main tasks of the delegations are:

- To coordinate the General State Administration services and public bodies in the region.
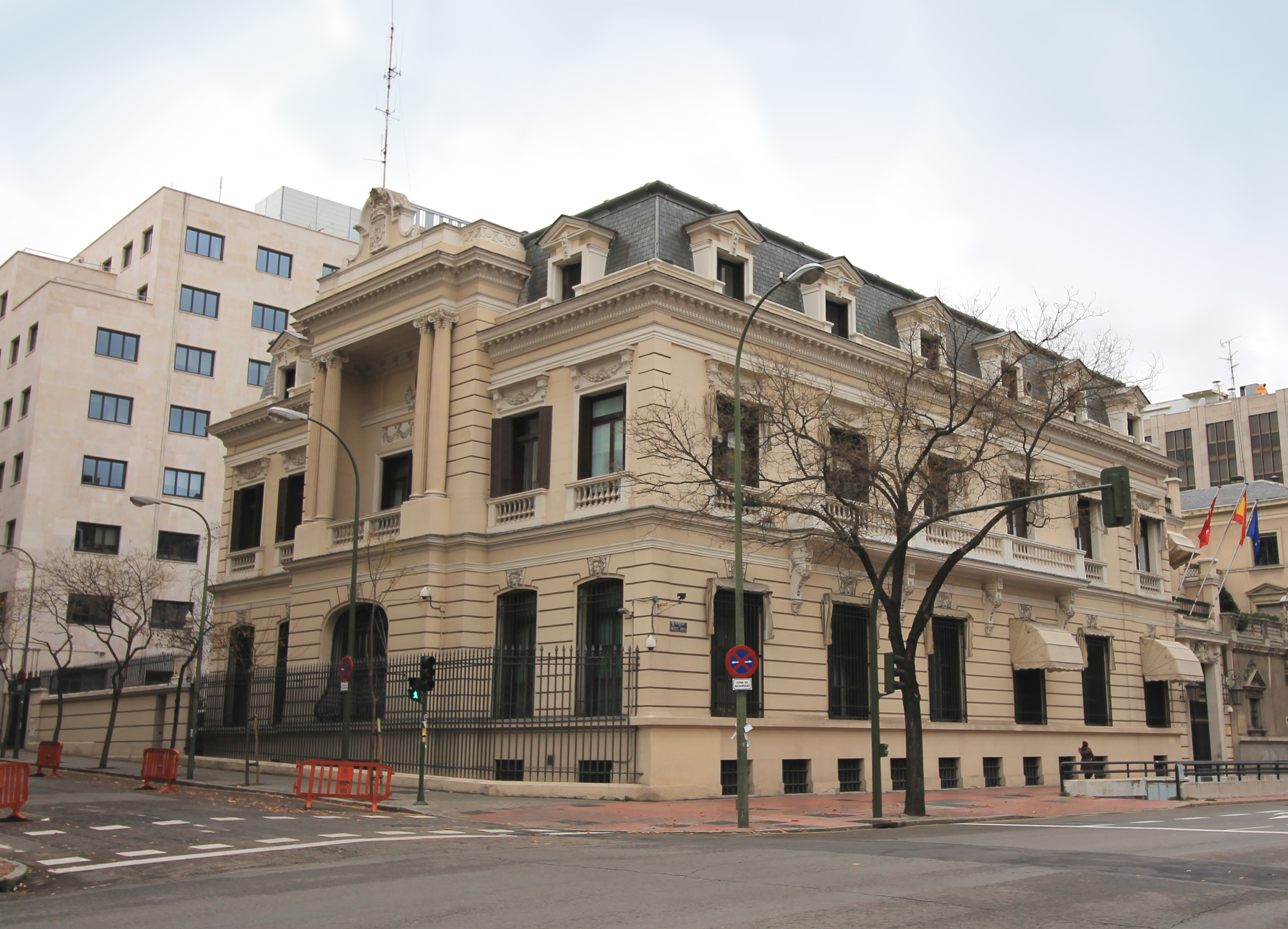
  Headquarters of the Delegation and Sub-delegation of the Government in the Community of Madrid.
- To inform the citizens about the government activities in the region.
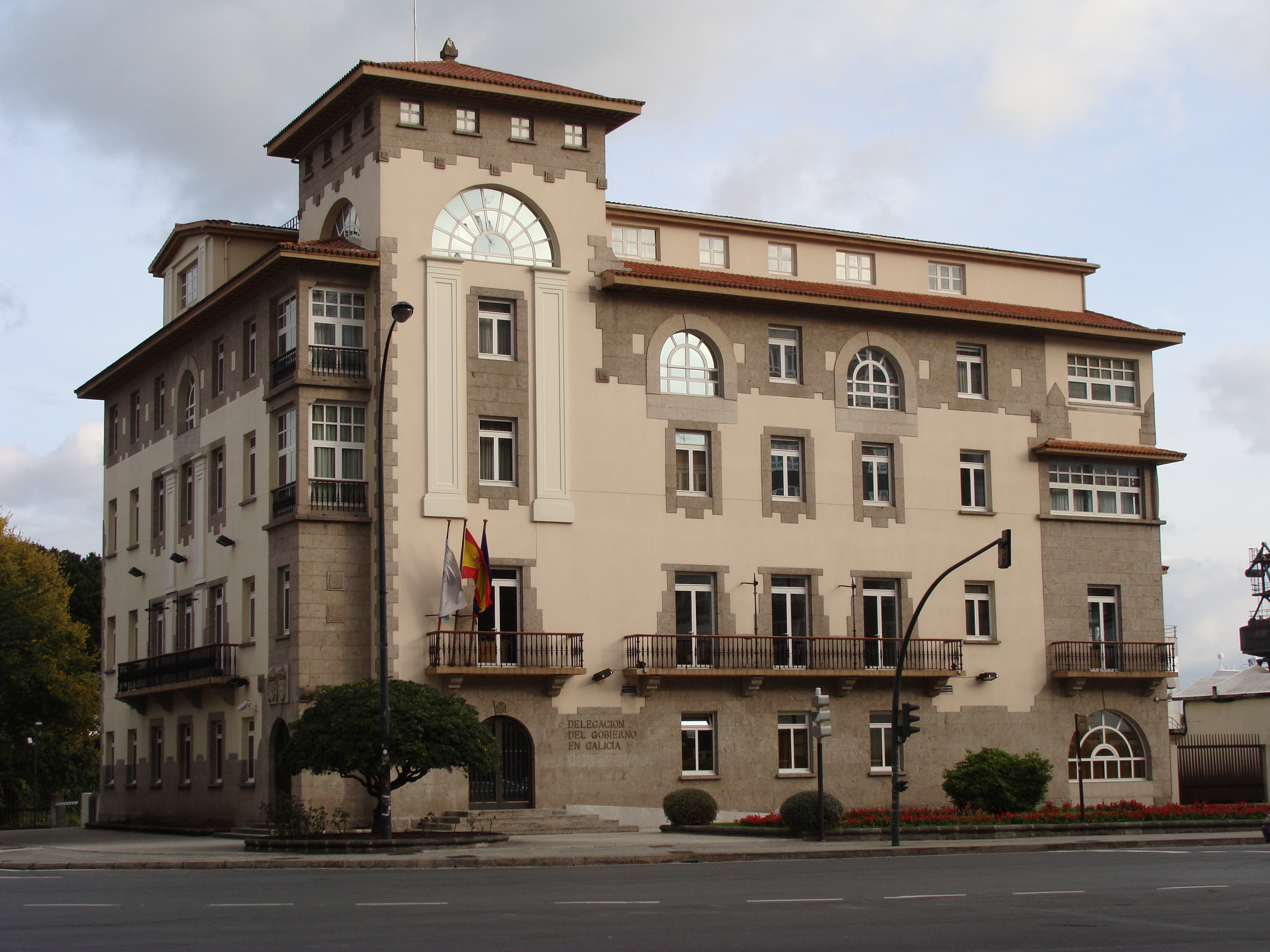
  Delegation of the Government in Galicia.
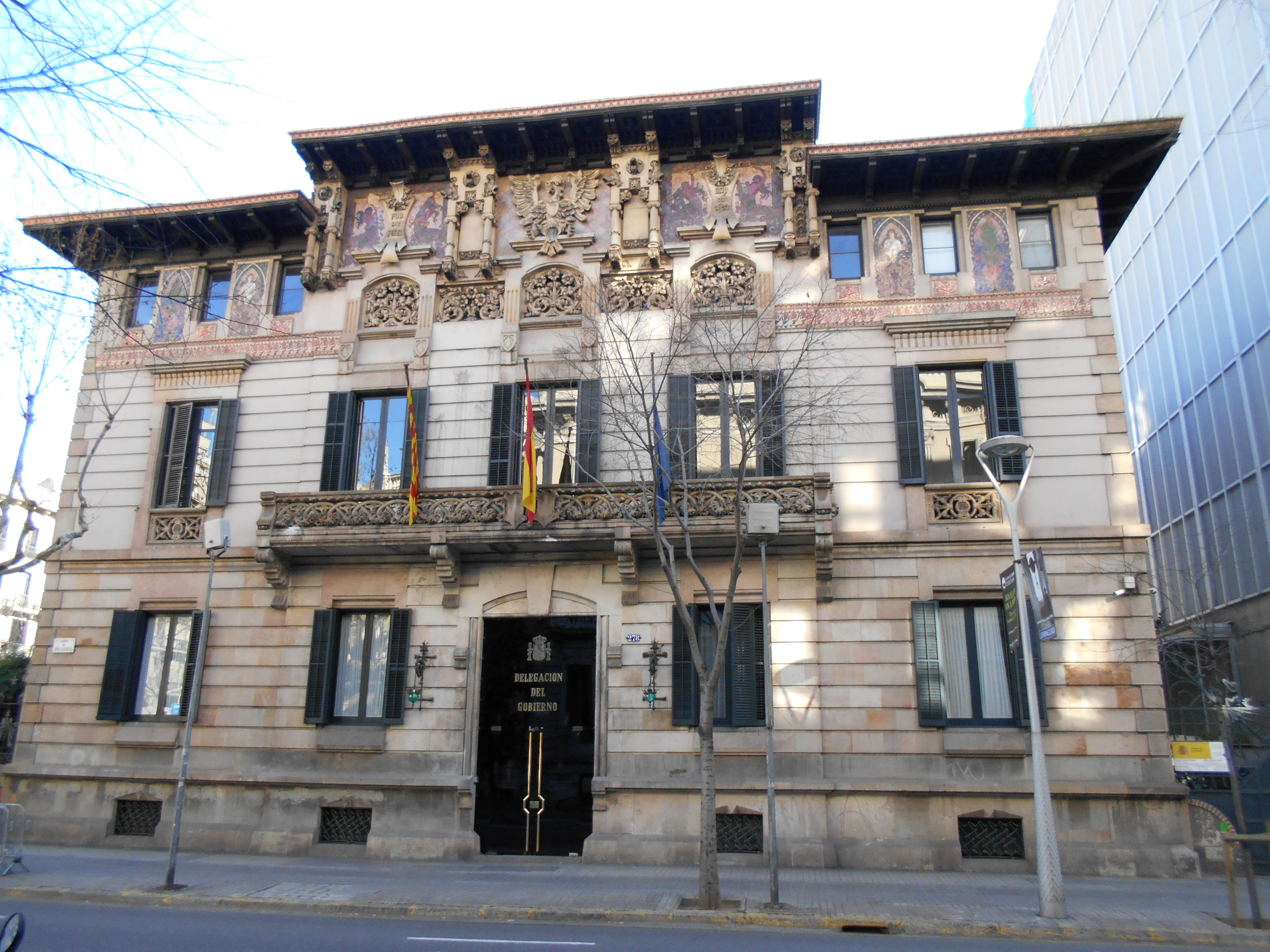
  Headquarters of the Government Delegation in Catalonia and of the Sub-delegation in Barcelona.
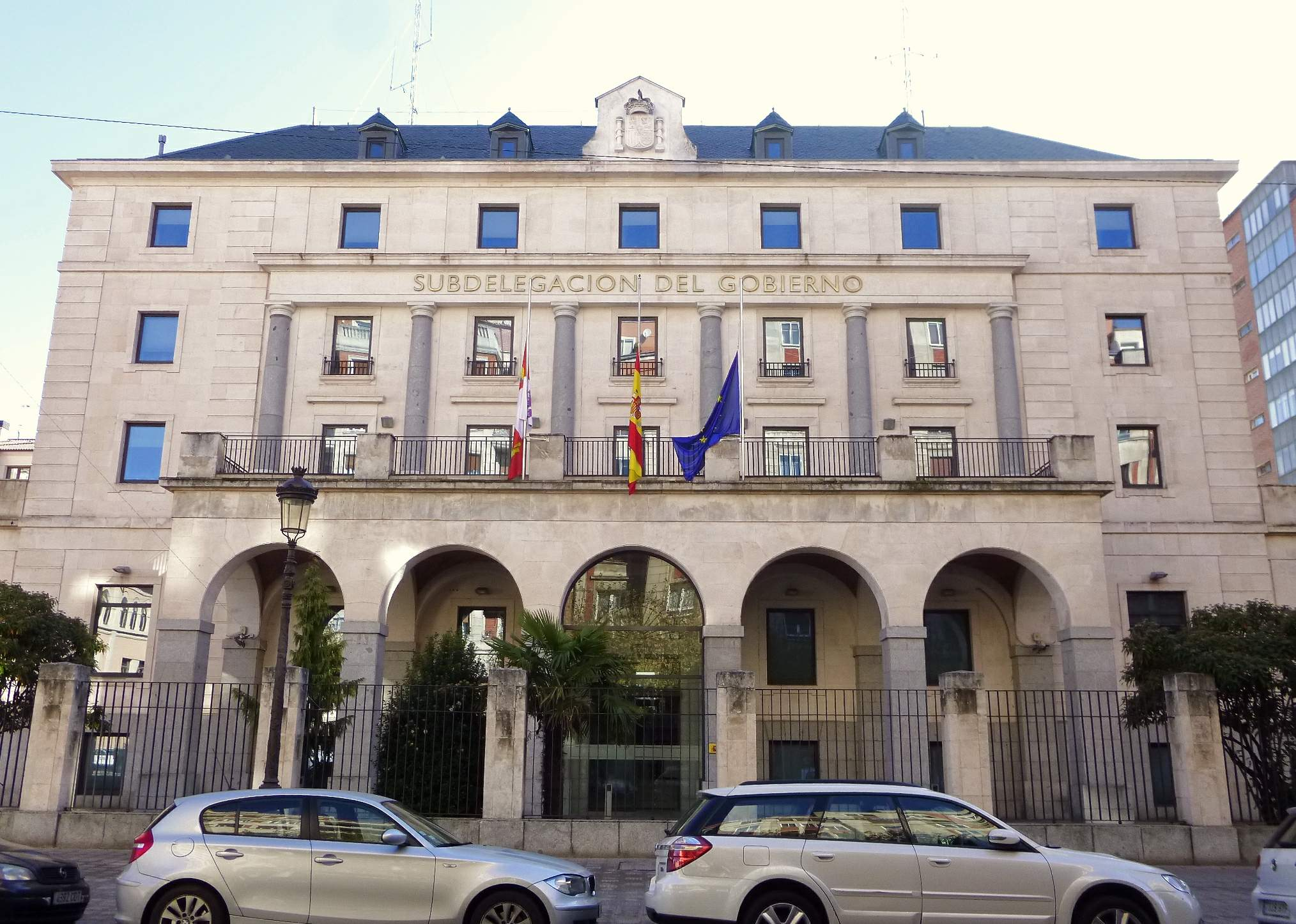
  Sub-delegation of the Government in Burgos.
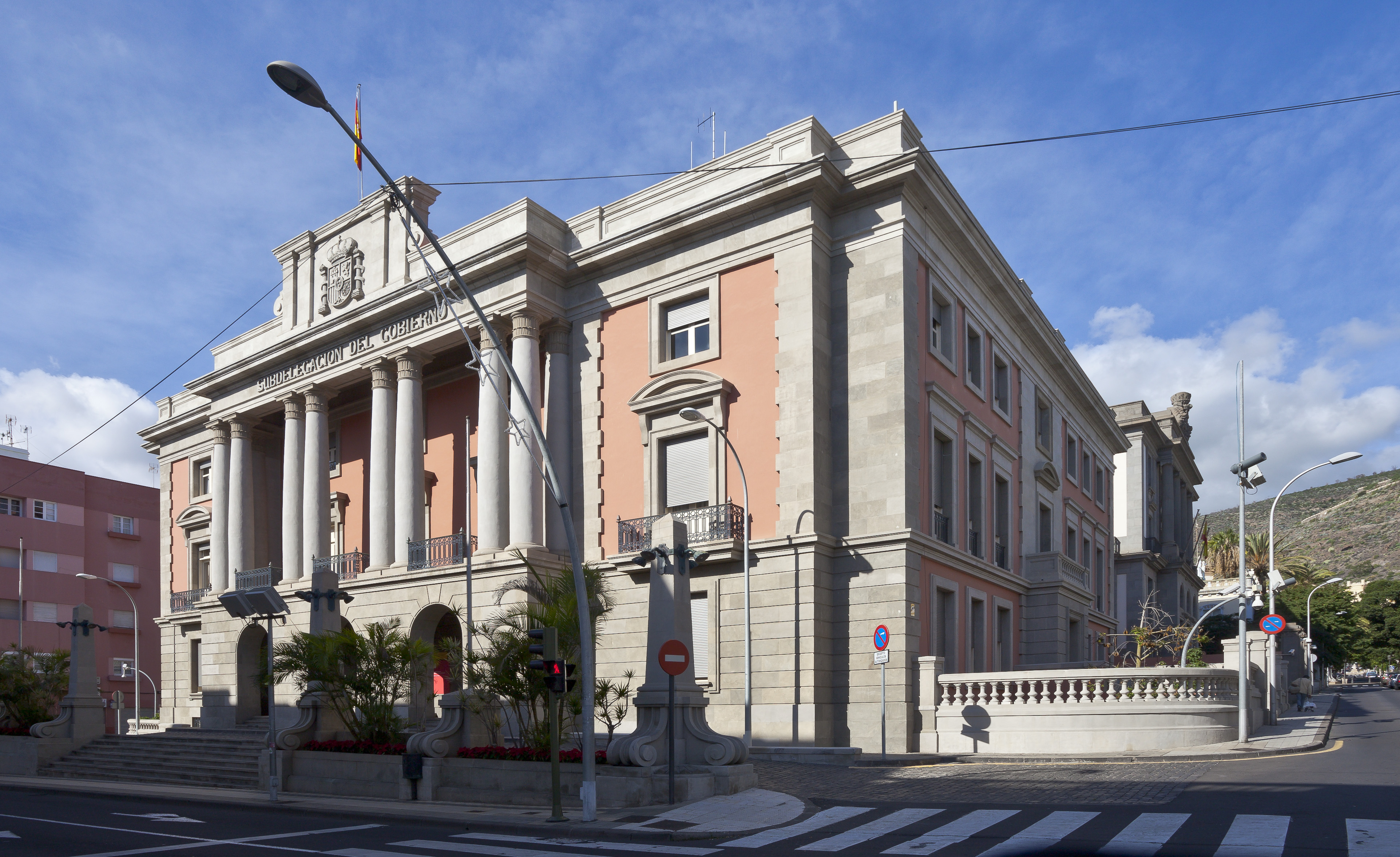
  Sub-delegation of the Government in Santa Cruz de Tenerife.
- To coordinate the government departments with other public administrations.
- To guarantee the correct application of the norms and laws and the respect for the powers of the central government.
- To propose measures to the Ministry responsible in order to avoid the inefficiency of the administration and the duplicity of public bodies.
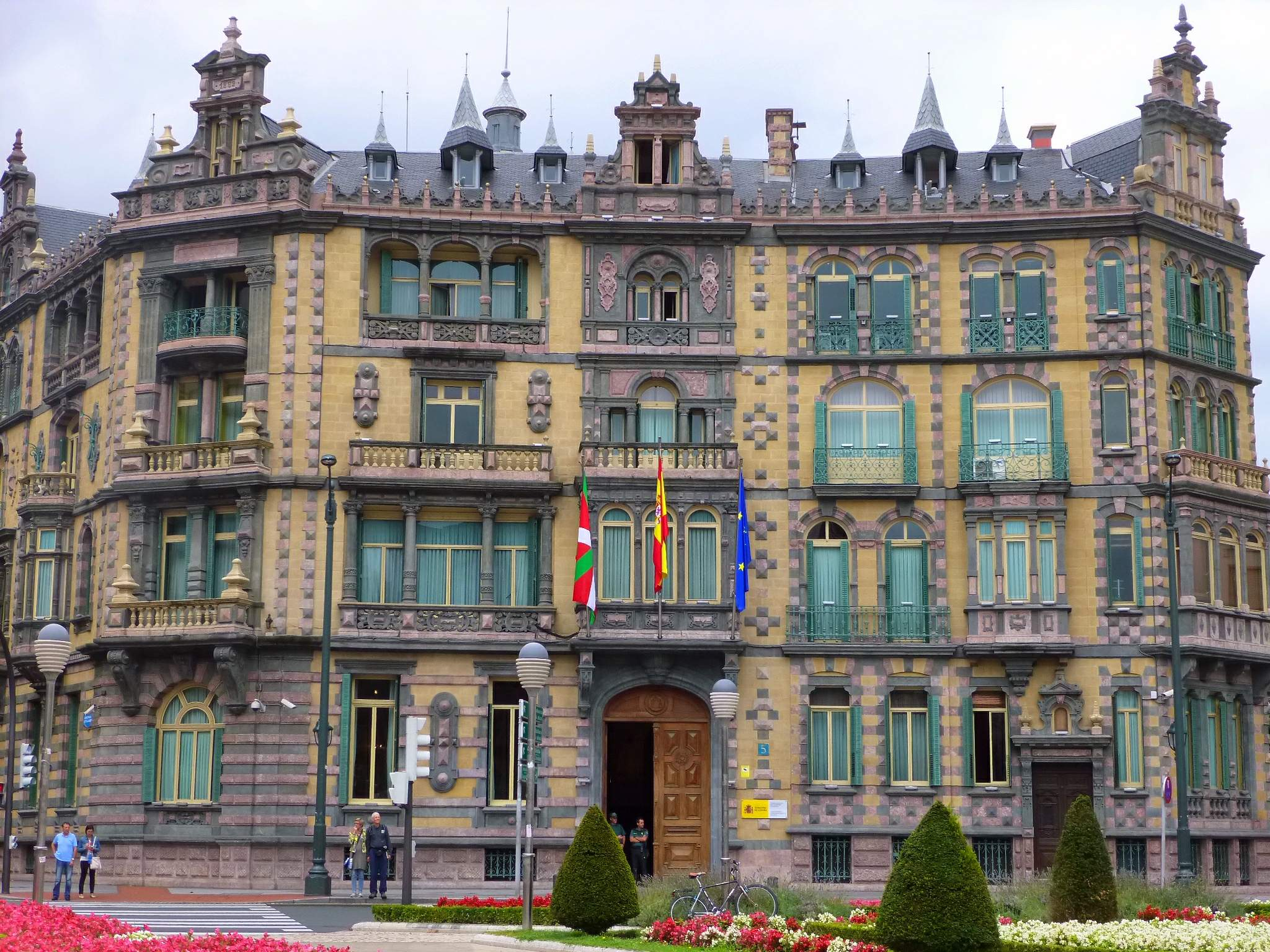
- Sub-delegation of the Government in Biscay.
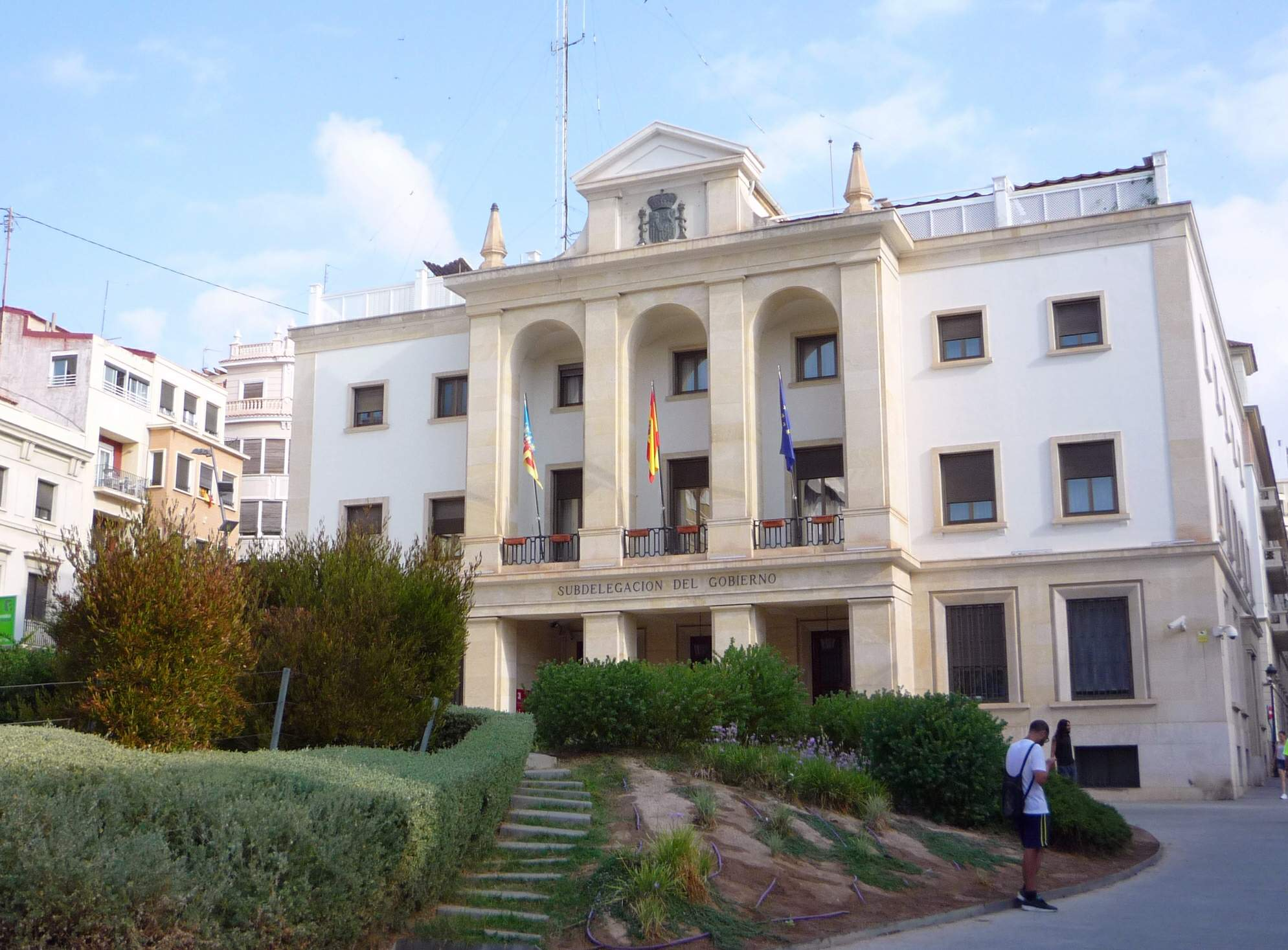
  Headquarters of the Government Sub-delegation in the Province of Alicante.
  It is up to the Government Delegates to protect the free exercise of the constitutional rights and freedoms and to guarantee public security, through the Government Sub-delegates and the State Security Forces and Corps. For this purpose, the Delegate is the head of the state law enforcement agencies in the region.

=== Government Sub-delegation ===
The Government Sub-delegations are bodies that represent the central government in the Spanish provinces. The Sub-delegations were created by the 1997 General State Administration Organization and Functioning Act to replace the Civil Governors. It exists a Sub-delegate of the Government in each province under the authority of the regional-level Government Delegate. They are appointed by the Delegate from career civil servants and they exercise the same powers of the Delegate but at a provincial level.

In the single-province autonomous communities and in the autonomous cities, as a general rule, the Government Delegate assumes the powers that the Law attributes to the Government Sub-delegates in the provinces. These regions are Asturias, Balearic Islands, Cantabria, Ceuta, Melilla, Murcia, Navarre and La Rioja. In Madrid, since 2003, because of its importance as the capital of the Kingdom and despite being a single-province region, there is both Delegate and Sub-Delegate of the Government.

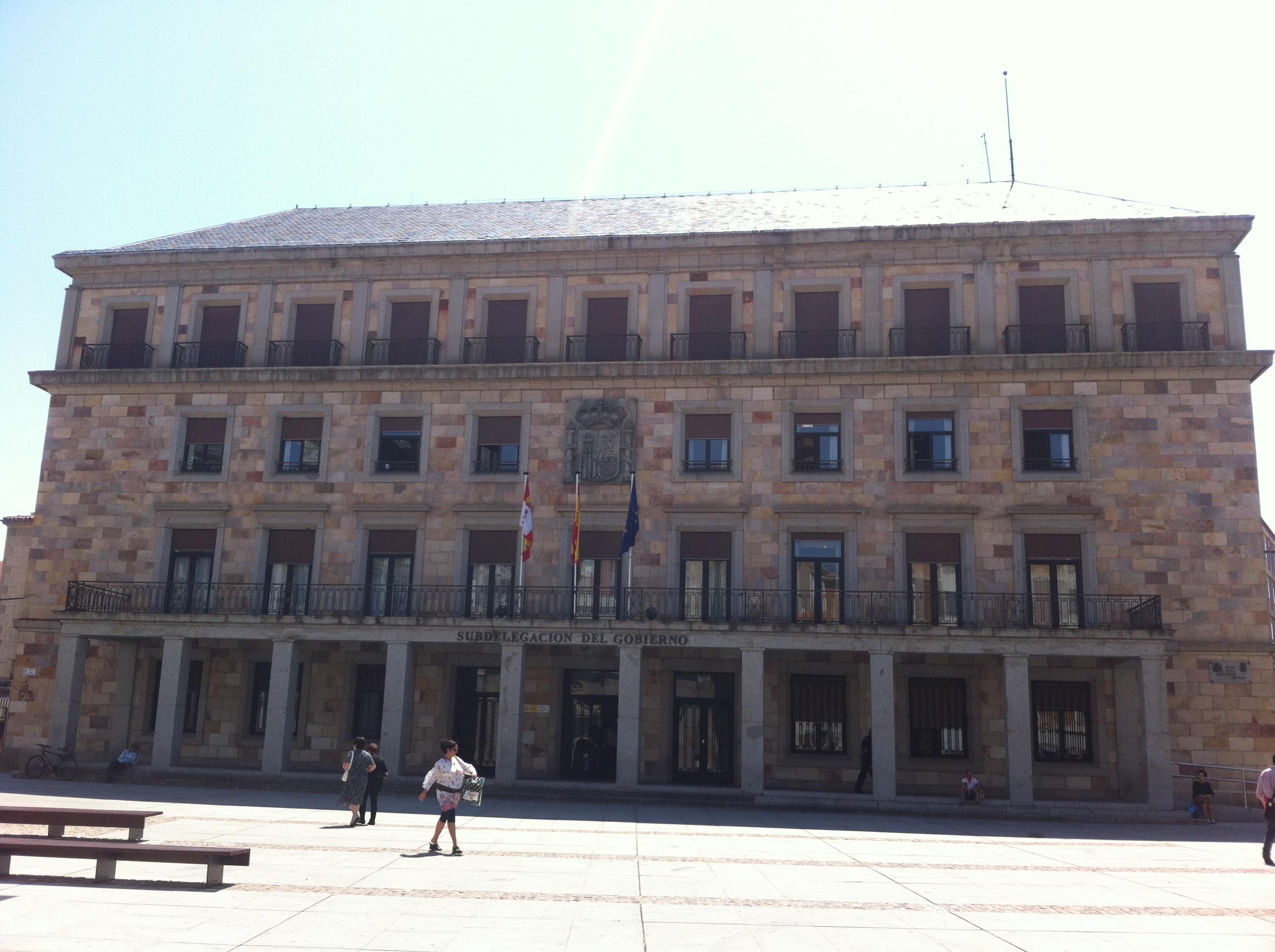
Headquarters of the Government Sub-delegation in Zamora.

=== Current delegations and sub-delegations ===
As of October 2026:

Delegation (Region)	Official	Term start	Refs.
Sub-delegation (Province)	Official	Term start	Refs.
Andalusia	Isabel Mayo López	21 October 2026	
Almería	Vacant	20 October 2026	
Cádiz	Blanca Pilar Flores Cueto	18 March 2024	
Córdoba	Vacant	20 October 2026	
Granada	Vacant	20 October 2026	
Huelva	María José Rico Cabrera	9 March 2024	
Jaén	Manuel Ángel Fernández Palomino	9 March 2024	
Málaga	Vacant	20 October 2026	
Seville	Vacant	20 October 2026	
Aragon	Noelia Herrero Arenas	21 October 2026	
Huesca	José Carlos Campo Subías	28 February 2024	
Teruel	José Ramón Morro García	7 September 2018	
Zaragoza	Fernando Ángel Beltrán Blázquez	31 July 2020	
Cantabria	Pedro Casares	30 July 2025	
Castilla–La Mancha	José Pablo Sabrido Fernández	8 January 2026	
Albacete	Miguel Juan Espinosa Plaza	17 June 2020	
Ciudad Real	David Broceño Caminero	6 March 2024	
Cuenca	María Luz Fernández Marín	15 June 2022	
Guadalajara	Susana Cabellos Porras	18 November 2024	
Toledo	Carlos Ángel Devia	11 September 2018	
Castile and León	Nicanor Jorge Sen Vélez	13 December 2023	
Ávila	Fernando Galeano Murillo	25 February 2022	
Burgos	Pedro Luis de la Fuente Fernández	5 October 2018	
León	Héctor Alaiz Moretón	22 October 2024	
Palencia	Eduardo Santiago Calleja	3 February 2026	
Salamanca	María Encarnación Pérez Álvarez	5 October 2018	
Segovia	María Ángeles Rueda Cayón	11 October 2024	
Soria	Miguel Latorre Zubiri	26 October 2018	
Valladolid	Jacinto Canales de Caso	12 April 2024	
Zamora	Ángel Blanco García	5 October 2018	
Catalonia	José Crespín Gómez	21 October 2026	
Barcelona	Vacant	20 October 2026	
Girona	Pere Parramon Rubio	14 May 2024	
Lleida	Vacant	20 October 2026	
Tarragona	Elisabet Romero Álvarez	23 April 2025	
Ceuta	David de la Encina	30 September 2026	
Community of Madrid	María Pilar Trinidad Núñez	28 October 2026	
Madrid	Vacant	27 October 2026	
Valencian Community	María Pilar Bernabé García	21 October 2026	
Alicante	Manuel Pineda Cuenca	18 May 2026	
Castellón	Antonia García Valls	23 February 2024	
Valencia	José Rodríguez Jurado	23 February 2024	
Extremadura	María Teresa Macías Mateos	21 October 2026	
Badajoz	María Isabel Cortés Gordillo	11 July 2024	
Cáceres	José Antonio García Muñoz	28 June 2018	
Galicia	Pedro Blanco Lobeiras	14 June 2023	
La Coruña	Julio Ernesto Abalde Alonso	13 November 2025	
Lugo	Olimpia López Rodríguez	13 November 2025	
Ourense	Eladio Santos Martínez	20 September 2024	
Pontevedra	Vacant	20 October 2026	
Balearic Islands	Pere Joan Pons	28 October 2026	
Canary Islands	Anselmo Pestana Padrón	12 February 2020	
Las Palmas	María Teresa Mayans Vázquez	4 December 2018	
Santa Cruz de Tenerife	Jesús Javier Plata Vera	5 October 2018	
La Rioja	Beatriz Arraiz Nalda	30 August 2022	
Melilla	Sabrina Moh Abdelkader	19 June 2018	
Navarre	Alicia Echeverría Jaime	13 December 2023	
Basque Country	María Soledad Garmendia Beloqui	13 March 2024	
Álava	Vacant	23 October 2026	
Guipúzcoa	Noemí López Fernández	23 April 2025	
Biscay	Carlos García Buendía	20 September 2024	
Principality of Asturias	Cecilia Pérez Sánchez	21 October 2026	
Region of Murcia	Francisco Lucas Ayala	3 September 2025	

== Insular Directorates ==
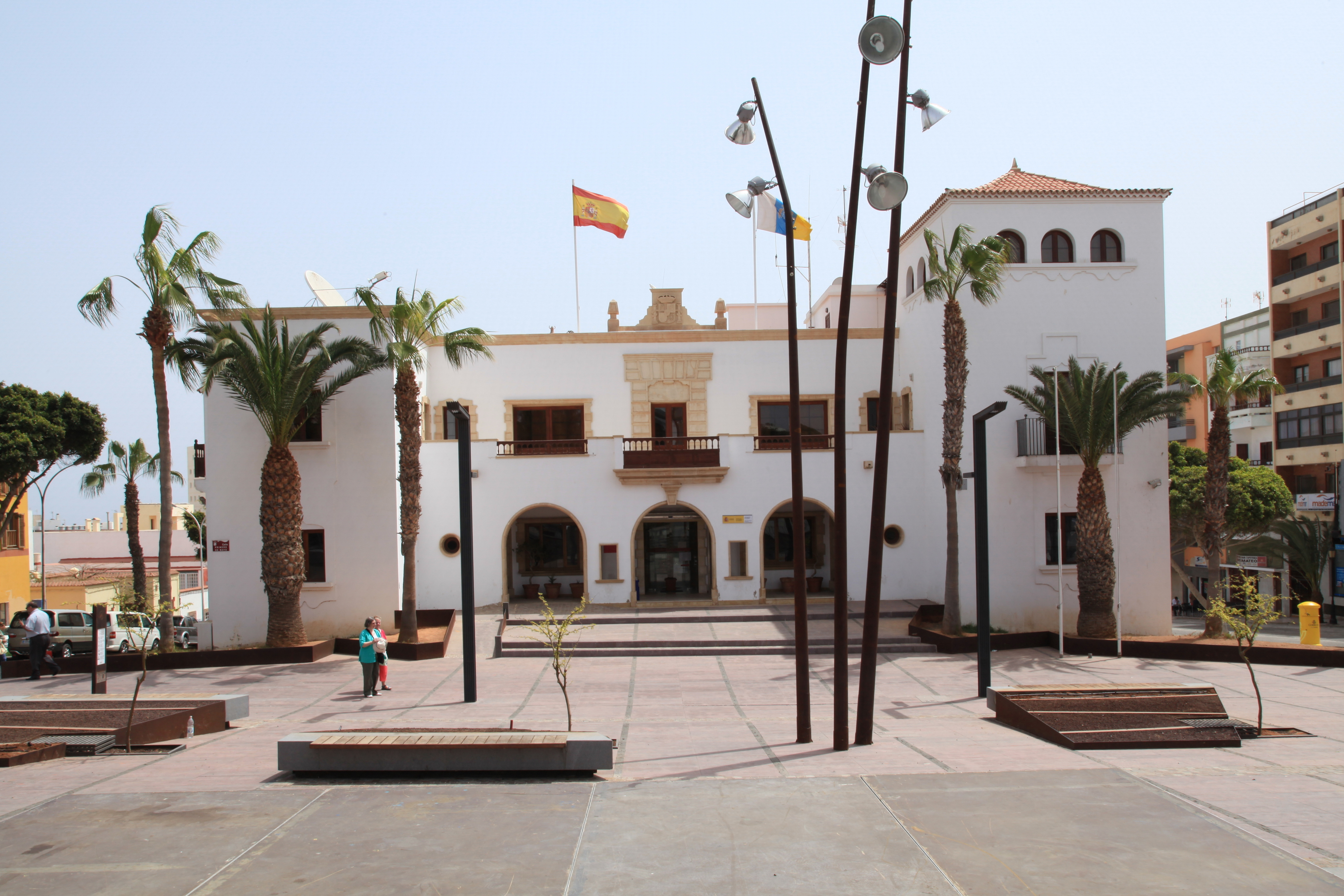
Headquarters of the central government's Insular Directorate in Fuerteventura.

According to Section 70 of the Legal Regime of the Public Sector Act, the existence of Insular Directors is not mandatory. When they exist, they are freely appointed by the Government Delegate among civil servants and they depend directly from the Delegate or the Sub-delegate if exists. Their official title is Insular Directors of the General State Administration and they possess the same powers as a subdelegate.

Directorate	Official	Term start	Refs.
Balearic Islands
Ibiza-Formentera	Raquel Guasch Ferrer	31 January 2024	
Menorca	Clara Mayans Torres	13 June 2025	
Canary Islands
Lanzarote	Pedro Viera Espinosa	15 January 2024	
Fuerteventura	María Jesús de la Cruz Montserrat	18 January 2024	
La Palma	Carlos García	6 September 2024	
La Gomera	Vacant	20 October 2026	
El Hierro	Vacant		

== Collective assistance bodies ==
In order to assist the Government Delegates, there are two kind of collective bodies. The first kind are to Government Delegations which powers extend in more than one province, while the second is for one-province delegations. The Sub-delegates also have an assistance bodies and there is a nation-wide committee to coordinate all Delegations.

=== More-than-one province ===
These bodies are chaired by the Delegate of the Government and made up of the Sub-delegates of the Government of the provinces of its jurisdiction and the heads of the other departments and agencies of the Delegation. They exist to coordinate the actions of the different bodies, to homogenize the policies, to advise the Delegate of the Government and to discuss any other matter that the Delegate considers relevant.

=== Single province delegation ===
In the single-province Autonomous Communities, there is an assistance body chaired by the Delegate of the Government and made up of the Secretary-General of the Delegation (who runs day-to-day the Delegation) and the heads of the other departments and agencies of the Delegation.

=== Government Sub-delegations ===
In each Sub-delegation of the Government there is an assistance committee to the Sub-delegate made up of the Secretary-General of the Sub-delegation and the heads of the other departments and services of the Sub-delegation. They do the same duties as the other assistance bodies but at a provincial level.

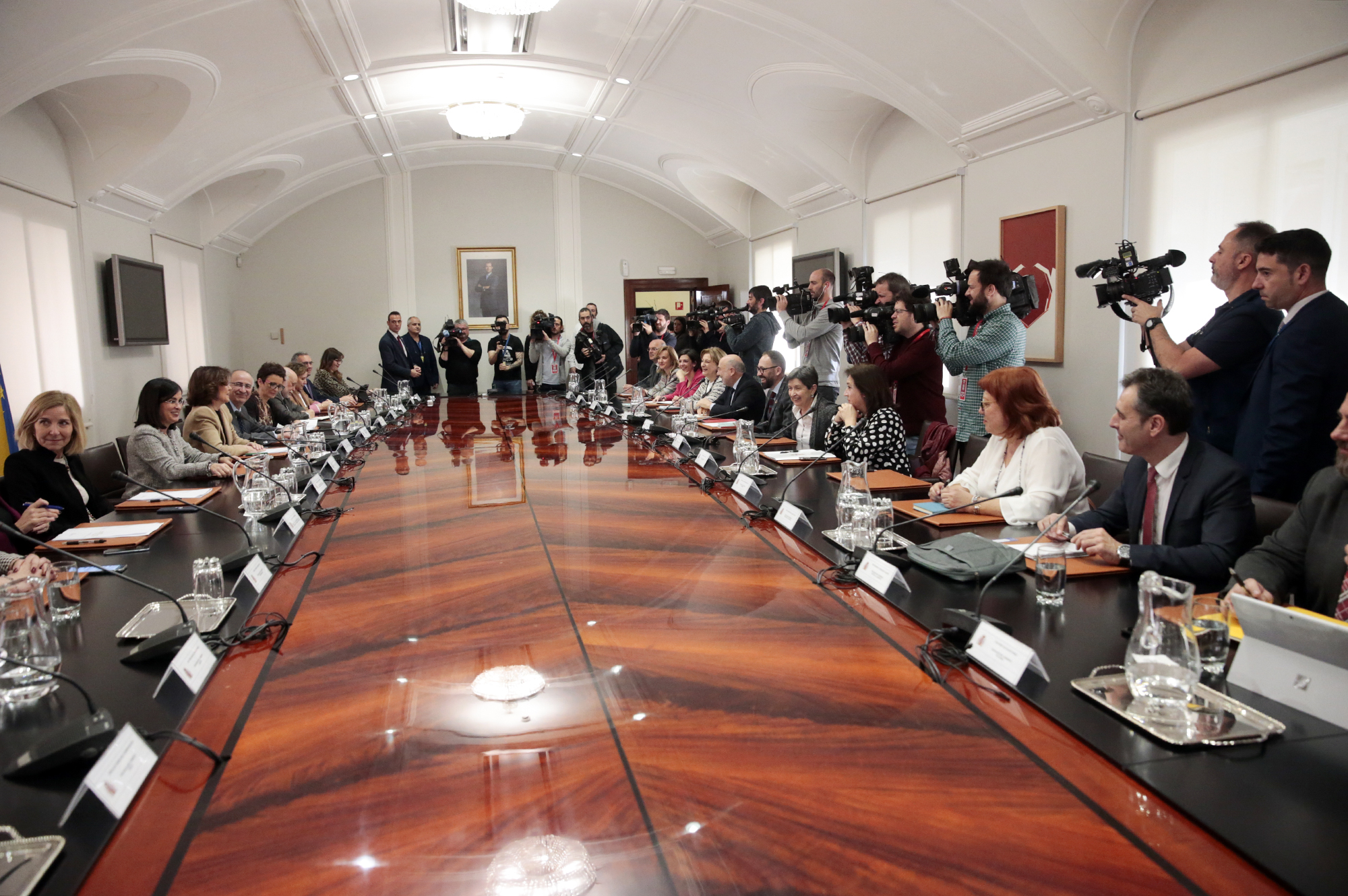
Coordination Committee' meeting in February 2020.

=== Interministerial Coordination Committee on the State Peripheral Administration ===
The Interministerial Coordination Committee on the State Peripheral Administration is a body of the Ministry of Territorial Policy and Civil Service chaired by the Minister and integrated by the Secretary of State for Territorial Policy (deputy chair), the Secretary-General for Territorial Coordination, all the Under Secretaries of the government departments, all the Delegates of the Government and the Director-General for Internal Policy. To the meetings of the committee also assists the Deputy Director-General for the Boost of Peripheral Administration which acts as Secretary of the committee and other senior officials of the Administrations invited by the chair.

The committee is charged with improving the coordination of the central government Peripheral Administration, to improve information sharing, to establish a unique criteria of action and to discuss relevant issues for the government policy in the regions.
