= 2023 Murcian regional election =

Election in the Spanish region of Murcia

- 28 May 2023

All 45 seats in the Regional Assembly of Murcia 23 seats needed for a majority
- Opinion polls
- Registered: 1,098,543 ▲3.7%
- Turnout: 694,855 (63.3%) ▲1.0 pp
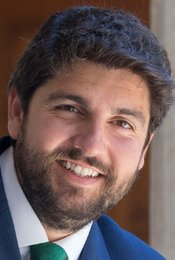

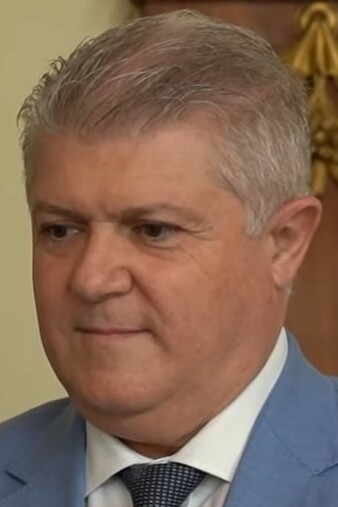

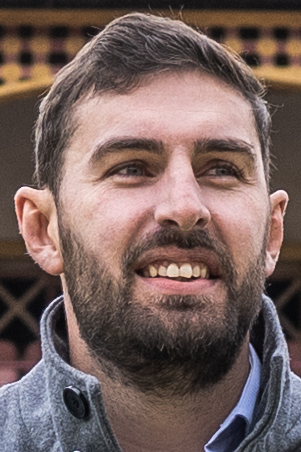

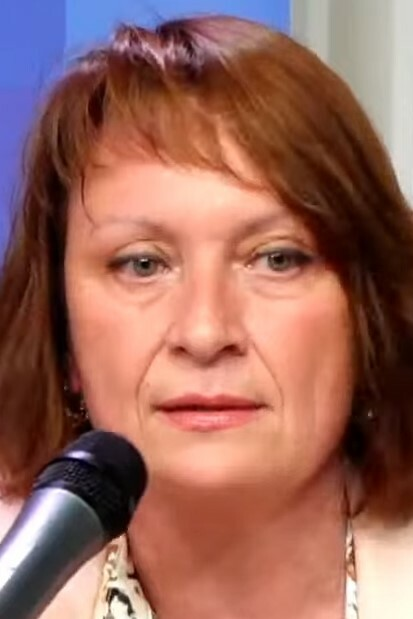

	First party	Second party	Third party
Leader	Fernando López Miras	José Vélez	José Ángel Antelo
Party	PP	PSOE	Vox
Leader since	3 May 2017	20 November 2021	2 January 2023
Last election	16 seats, 32.4%	17 seats, 32.5%	4 seats, 9.5%
Seats won	21	13	9
Seat change	▲5	▼4	▲5
Popular vote	293,051	175,505	121,321
Percentage	42.8%	25.6%	17.7%
Swing	▲10.4 pp	▼6.8 pp	▲8.3 pp
	Fourth party	Fifth party
Leader	María Marín	María José Ros
Party	Podemos–IU–AV	CS
Leader since	18 January 2023	8 February 2023
Last election	2 seats, 7.6% (Note: Results for Podemos–Equo (5.6%, 2 seats) and Change the Region of Murcia (United Left–Greens+Anticapitalistas) (2.0%, 0 seats) in the 2019 election.)	6 seats, 12.0%
Seats won	2	0
Seat change	0	▼6
Popular vote	32,173	10,480
Percentage	4.7%	1.5%
Swing	▼2.9 pp	▼10.5 pp
President before election
Fernando López Miras
PP
Elected President
Fernando López Miras
PP

A regional election was held in the Region of Murcia on 28 May 2023 to elect the 11th Regional Assembly of the autonomous community. All 45 seats in the Regional Assembly were up for election. It was held concurrently with regional elections in eleven other autonomous communities and local elections all across Spain.

== Overview ==
=== Electoral system ===
The Regional Assembly of Murcia was the devolved, unicameral legislature of the autonomous community of Murcia, having legislative power in regional matters as defined by the Spanish Constitution and the Murcian Statute of Autonomy, as well as the ability to vote confidence in or withdraw it from a regional president. Voting for the Regional Assembly was on the basis of universal suffrage, which comprised all nationals over 18 years of age, registered in the Region of Murcia and in full enjoyment of their political rights. Amendments to the electoral law in 2022 abolished the "begged" or expat vote system (Spanish: Voto rogado), under which Spaniards abroad were required to apply for voting before being permitted to vote. The expat vote system was attributed responsibility for a major decrease in the turnout of Spaniards abroad during the years it had been in force.

The 45 members of the Regional Assembly of Murcia were elected using the D'Hondt method and a closed list proportional representation, with an electoral threshold of three percent of valid votes—which included blank ballots—being applied regionally.

=== Election date ===
The term of the Regional Assembly of Murcia expired four years after the date of its previous election. Elections to the Regional Assembly were fixed for the fourth Sunday of May every four years. The previous election was held on 26 May 2019, setting the election date for the Regional Assembly on 23 May 2023.

The president had the prerogative to dissolve the Regional Assembly of Murcia and call a snap election, provided that no motion of no confidence was in process, no nationwide election was due and some time requirements were met: namely, that dissolution did not occur either during the first legislative session or within the legislature's last year ahead of its scheduled expiry, nor before one year had elapsed since a previous dissolution under this procedure. In the event of an investiture process failing to elect a regional president within a two-month period from the first ballot, the Regional Assembly was to be automatically dissolved and a fresh election called. Any snap election held as a result of these circumstances would not alter the period to the next ordinary election, with elected lawmakers serving the remainder of its original four-year term.

The election to the Regional Assembly of Murcia was officially triggered on 4 April 2023 after the publication of the election decree in the Official Gazette of the Region of Murcia (BORM), scheduling for the chamber to convene on 14 June.

== Parliamentary composition ==
The table below shows the composition of the parliamentary groups in the Regional Assembly at the time of dissolution.

Parliamentary composition in April 2023
Groups	Parties	Legislators	
Groups	Parties	Seats	Total
Socialist Parliamentary Group	PSOE	17	17
People's Parliamentary Group	PP	16	16
Citizens Parliamentary Group	INDEP	4	4
Vox Parliamentary Group	Vox	1	4
Vox Parliamentary Group	INDEP	3	4
Mixed Group	CS	2	4
Mixed Group	Podemos	1	4
Mixed Group	Verdes Equo	1	4

== Parties and candidates ==
The electoral law allowed for parties and federations registered in the interior ministry, coalitions and groupings of electors to present lists of candidates. Parties and federations intending to form a coalition ahead of an election were required to inform the relevant Electoral Commission within ten days of the election call, whereas groupings of electors needed to secure the signature of at least one percent of the electorate in the Region of Murcia, disallowing electors from signing for more than one list of candidates.

Below is a list of the main parties and electoral alliances which contested the election:

Candidacy	Parties and alliances	Leading candidate	Ideology	Previous result		Gov.	Ref.
Candidacy	Parties and alliances	Leading candidate	Ideology	Vote %	Seats	Gov.	Ref.
PSOE	List: Spanish Socialist Workers' Party (PSOE)	José Vélez	Social democracy	32.5%	17	No	
PP	List: People's Party (PP)	Fernando López Miras	Conservatism; Christian democracy	32.4%	16	Yes	
CS	List: Citizens–Party of the Citizenry (CS)	María José Ros	Liberalism	12.0%	6	No	
Vox	List: Vox (Vox)	José Ángel Antelo	Right-wing populism Ultranationalism; National conservatism	9.5%	4	No	
Podemos– IU–AV	List: We Can (Podemos); United Left–Greens of the Region of Murcia (IU–V–RM) – Communist Party of the Region of Murcia (PCM) – Ecosocialists of the Region of Murcia (ESRM) – The Dawn Marxist Organization (La Aurora (OM)) – Republican Left (IR); Green Alliance (AV)	María Marín	Left-wing populism Direct democracy Democratic socialism	7.6%	2	No	
MR–VE	List: More Region of Murcia (Más Región); Greens Equo (Verdes Equo)	Helena Vidal	Green politics Direct democracy Alter-globalization	—N/a (Note: Equo contested the 2019 election in an electoral alliance with Podemos.)		No	

== Opinion polls ==
The tables below list opinion polling results in reverse chronological order, showing the most recent first and using the dates when the survey fieldwork was done, as opposed to the date of publication. Where the fieldwork dates are unknown, the date of publication is given instead. The highest percentage figure in each polling survey is displayed with its background shaded in the leading party's colour. If a tie ensues, this is applied to the figures with the highest percentages. The "Lead" column on the right shows the percentage-point difference between the parties with the highest percentages in a poll.

=== Graphical summary ===
Local regression trend line of poll results from 26 May 2019 to 28 May 2023, with each line corresponding to a political party.

=== Voting intention estimates ===
The table below lists weighted voting intention estimates. Refusals are generally excluded from the party vote percentages, while question wording and the treatment of "don't know" responses and those not intending to vote may vary between polling organisations. When available, seat projections determined by the polling organisations are displayed below (or in place of) the percentages in a smaller font; 23 seats were required for an absolute majority in the Regional Assembly of Murcia.

Polling firm/Commissioner	Fieldwork date	Sample size	Turnout	PSOE	PP	CS	Vox	Podemos	MCC	xMR	IU–V–RM	Unidas Podemos	Más País	Lead
2023 regional election	28 May 2023	—N/a	63.2	25.6; 13	42.8; 21	1.5; 0	17.7; 9	(Note: Within Unidas Podemos.)	3.0; 0	0.4; 0		4.7; 2	1.3; 0	17.2
NC Report/La Razón	22 May 2023	?	?	28.8; 14/15	39.1; 19/20	–	16.0; 7/8		3.7; 1	–		5.8; 2/3	–	10.3
KeyData/Público	18 May 2023	?	64.4	29.0; 15	39.4; 20	2.7; 0	15.1; 7		–	–		7.4; 3	–	10.4
EM-Analytics/El Plural	11–17 May 2023	600	?	29.2; 15	38.8; 19	2.9; 0	16.4; 8		2.0; 0	1.8; 0		6.2; 3	2.0; 0	9.6
CEMOP	8–17 May 2023	1,200	62.8	29.6; 14/15	40.9; 20/21	2.5; 0	15.5; 7/8		3.1; 0/1	–		4.6; 2	–	11.3
UCAM	3–12 May 2023	800	?	28.9; 14/15	38.9; 19/20	1.7; 0	15.6; 8		3.6; 1	–		5.6; 2	–	10.0
EM-Analytics/El Plural	4–10 May 2023	600	?	29.0; 14	39.3; 20	2.9; 0	16.2; 8		1.9; 0	1.8; 0		6.2; 3	2.0; 0	10.3
EM-Analytics/El Plural	26 Apr–3 May 2023	600	?	29.1; 14	39.3; 20	2.9; 0	16.2; 8		1.9; 0	1.9; 0		6.2; 3	2.0; 0	10.2
Actuatech/PSOE	19–28 Apr 2023	800	63.9	31.2; 17	32.2; 17	2.7; 0	16.8; 8		–	–		7.2; 3	–	1.0
GAD3/ABC	26–27 Apr 2023	1,000	?	28.3; 14	39.3; 19/20	–	15.8; 7/8		3.3; 1	–		6.4; 3	–	11.0
CIS	10–26 Apr 2023	631	?	30.5; 14/16	36.2; 17/18	2.1; 0	16.8; 7/9		–	–		9.8; 4/5	–	5.7
EM-Analytics/El Plural	19–25 Apr 2023	600	?	29.1; 14	39.4; 20	2.8; 0	16.1; 8		2.0; 0	1.9; 0		6.2; 3	1.8; 0	10.3
EM-Analytics/El Plural	12–18 Apr 2023	600	?	29.3; 14	39.5; 20	2.7; 0	16.6; 8		2.0; 0	2.0; 0		6.2; 3	–	10.2
EM-Analytics/El Plural	5–11 Apr 2023	600	?	29.1; 14	39.3; 20	2.7; 0	17.2; 8		2.0; 0	2.0; 0		6.1; 3	–	10.2
Simple Lógica/elDiario.es	3–11 Apr 2023	450	?	27.7; 14/15	32.2; 16/17	5.0; 2	16.1; 7/8		–	–		11.4; 4/5	3.2; 1	4.5
SocioMétrica/El Español	3–7 Apr 2023	1,200	?	29.3; 14/15	41.4; 21/22	2.5; 0	14.3; 7		–	–		6.2; 2	–	12.1
EM-Analytics/El Plural	27 Mar–4 Apr 2023	600	?	29.3; 15	38.6; 19	3.0; 0	17.3; 8		2.0; 0	2.1; 0		6.1; 3	–	9.3
NC Report/La Razón	24–31 Mar 2023	?	64.3	29.5; 15	42.9; 21	2.8; 0	12.4; 6		–	–		7.6; 3	–	13.4
CEMOP	20–31 Mar 2023	1,200	66.2	29.2; 14/15	40.9; 20/21	2.1; 0	15.5; 7		–	–		6.2; 3	–	11.7
Actuatech/PSOE	2 Feb–3 Mar 2023	1,200	64.0	30.8; 17/18	32.6; 17/18	2.9; 0	14.5; 7/8		–	–		6.1; 2/3	–	1.8
CEMOP	23–31 Jan 2023	820	64.7	29.7; 14/15	40.7; 20/21	2.5; 0	14.3; 7		–	–		6.4; 3	–	11.0
Sigma Dos/El Mundo	2–10 Jan 2023	779	?	29.3; 14/15	41.4; 20/21	2.5; 0	15.3; 7		–	–		6.2; 2	–	12.1
InvyMark	12–18 Dec 2022	1,100	?	28.6; 13/14	37.6; 18/19	2.1; 0	20.1; 10		–	–		5.6; 2	–	9.0
CIS (Note: Vote+Simpathy figures with undecided and/or abstentionists excluded.)	17 Nov–2 Dec 2022	329	?	32.9; 15/17	41.4; 18/23	0.6; 0/2	10.2; 4/6		–	–		8.1; 3/5	0.3; 0	8.5
CEMOP	3–17 Oct 2022	820	63.5	29.3; 15	39.6; 20	2.4; 0	15.2; 8		–	–		5.6; 2	–	10.3
InvyMark	27 Jun–6 Jul 2022	1,500	?	29.9; 14/15	33.5; 16/17	2.1; 0	24.3; 11/12		–	–		5.5; 3	–	3.6
CEMOP	31 May–8 Jun 2022	820	68.0	28.8; 14	38.1; 19	3.2; 1	18.5; 9		–	–		4.5; 2	–	9.3
UCAM	4–21 Apr 2022	800	59.1	28.6; 14	38.6; 19	3.3; 1	16.2; 8		–	–		6.3; 3	–	10.0
CEMOP	15 Feb–2 Mar 2022	820	64.0	30.3; 15	36.6; 19	2.2; 0	16.2; 8		–	–		6.5; 3	–	6.3
EM-Analytics/Electomanía	31 Oct 2021	?	?	29.5; 15	42.8; 22	2.7; 0	12.9; 6		1.5; 0	1.5; 0		5.6; 2	–	13.3
CEMOP	18–28 Oct 2021	827	64.0	29.5; 14	39.4; 20	4.7; 2	13.5; 6		–	–		7.1; 3	–	9.9
EM-Analytics/Electomanía	15 Jun 2021	850	?	32.3; 16	41.9; 21	2.4; 0	13.0; 6		1.7; 0	1.7; 0		4.9; 2	–	9.6
UCAM	10–17 May 2021	800	59.2	27.1; 13	39.7; 20	3.4; 1	15.6; 8		–	0.7; 0		4.6; 2	3.1; 1	12.6
CEMOP	4–14 May 2021	820	63.3	27.6; 14	43.7; 22	3.4; 1	13.7; 6		–	–		5.3; 2	–	16.1
Murcia Electoral	16–17 Mar 2021	675	?	31.3; 16	30.9; 16	5.7; 3	16.4; 8	5.5; 2	2.2; 0	2.4; 0	–	–	2.1; 0	0.4
EM-Analytics/Electomanía	14 Mar 2021	850	?	33.3; 17	40.1; 20	2.8; 0	12.4; 6	4.4; 2	1.7; 0	1.8; 0	0.4; 0	–	–	6.8
SyM Consulting	12–13 Mar 2021	1,076	61.7	27.9; 14/15	36.5; 19	3.0; 0	22.2; 11/12	2.8; 0	2.4; 0	1.7; 0	1.4; 0	–	–	8.6
Sigma Dos/La Verdad	10–12 Mar 2021	1,100	?	29.1; 14	35.8; 17/18	6.7; 3	18.2; 8/9	5.0; 2	–	–	–	–	–	6.7
UCAM	9–23 Dec 2020	809	59.2	30.5; 15	34.1; 17	7.6; 3	13.4; 7		–	–		6.9; 3	–	3.6
CEMOP	14–22 Dec 2020	824	64.4	27.6; 14	38.7; 19	7.2; 3	15.6; 7		–	–		5.1; 2	–	11.1
SyM Consulting	16–18 Oct 2020	1,131	61.3	29.1; 15	34.1; 17/18	3.4; 1	20.3; 10	3.7; 1/2	2.6; 0	2.7; 0	1.6; 0	–	–	5.0
CEMOP	2–15 Oct 2020	825	64.9	27.3; 13	39.3; 20	6.8; 3	15.7; 7		–	–		4.9; 2	–	12.0
Murcia Electoral	29 Jul–5 Aug 2020	1,841	?	31.4; 16	33.9; 17	9.6; 5	10.9; 5	5.1; 2	2.3; 0	2.2; 0	0.4; 0	–	1.9; 0	2.5
Murcia Electoral	2–9 Jun 2020	1,721	?	29.6; 15	34.1; 18	9.2; 4	11.8; 6	5.7; 2	2.2; 0	2.5; 0	0.3; 0	–	2.2; 0	4.5
ElectoPanel/Electomanía	1 Apr–15 May 2020	?	?	33.6; 16	38.5; 19	6.5; 3	11.4; 5	4.3; 2	1.7; 0	1.7; 0	0.9; 0	–	–	4.9
CEMOP	20–29 Apr 2020	804	64.2	31.0; 15	38.8; 19	7.9; 3/4	11.8; 5/6		–	–		5.5; 2	–	7.8
SyM Consulting	30–31 Mar 2020	1,089	60.6	30.6; 15/16	33.8; 17	8.7; 4	14.8; 7	3.4; 1/2	2.6; 0	2.3; 0	1.5; 0	–	–	3.2
ElectoPanel/Electomanía	6–8 Dec 2019	?	?	26.0; 12/15	25.4; 12/14	7.8; 3/4	24.3; 11/14	6.6; 2/3	2.9; 0/1	2.8; 0/1	1.7; 0	–	1.0; 0	0.6
November 2019 general election	10 Nov 2019	—N/a	68.0	24.8; 12	26.5; 13	7.4; 3	28.0; 13		–	0.3; 0		8.9; 4	1.9; 0	1.5
Sigma Dos/La Verdad	9–10 Jul 2019	600	?	35.4; 18	31.2; 15	9.6; 4	11.9; 6	5.3; 2	–	–	–	–	–	4.2
2019 regional election	26 May 2019	—N/a	62.3	32.5; 17	32.4; 16	12.0; 6	9.5; 4	5.6; 2	2.2; 0	2.0; 0	2.0; 0	–	–	0.1

=== Voting preferences ===
The table below lists raw, unweighted voting preferences.

Polling firm/Commissioner	Fieldwork date	Sample size	PSOE	PP	CS	Vox	Podemos	IU–V–RM	Unidas Podemos	Question	X mark	Lead
2023 regional election	28 May 2023	—N/a	16.3	27.2	1.0	11.3			3.0	—N/a	34.3	10.9
Actuatech/PSOE	19–28 Apr 2023	800	13.1	26.8	0.5	10.9			4.0	28.5	9.5	13.7
CIS	10–26 Apr 2023	631	21.4	26.0	1.0	13.1			6.9	24.2	3.2	4.6
CEMOP	20–31 Mar 2023	1,200	17.1	29.6	1.7	13.1			3.9	17.1	8.0	12.5
Actuatech/PSOE	2 Feb–3 Mar 2023	1,200	14.4	27.2	0.7	9.3			2.3	31.1	10.0	12.8
CEMOP	23–31 Jan 2023	820	14.9	27.6	1.7	12.1			3.8	25.7	5.9	12.7
CIS	17 Nov–2 Dec 2022	329	21.2	27.9	0.3	7.1			4.8	30.4	4.2	6.7
CEMOP	3–17 Oct 2022	820	13.8	27.3	1.5	13.8			3.7	19.3	8.3	13.5
CEMOP	31 May–8 Jun 2022	820	17.7	25.5	3.4	16.8			3.0	13.4	9.4	7.8
CEMOP	15 Feb–2 Mar 2022	820	16.7	20.5	0.9	9.5			5.0	26.2	15.1	3.8
CEMOP	18–28 Oct 2021	827	16.2	24.8	2.7	11.7			5.1	17.6	8.5	8.6
CEMOP	4–14 May 2021	820	14.3	30.5	1.8	11.3			4.0	19.8	9.4	16.2
CEMOP	14–22 Dec 2020	824	15.4	25.1	5.1	13.2			4.5	20.8	8.6	9.7
CEMOP	2–15 Oct 2020	825	15.0	23.8	3.8	12.4			3.6	19.6	11.0	8.8
CEMOP	20–29 Apr 2020	804	14.8	24.6	3.1	7.6			4.4	29.8	11.9	9.8
November 2019 general election	10 Nov 2019	—N/a	17.2	18.4	5.2	19.4			6.1	—N/a	30.0	1.0
2019 regional election	26 May 2019	—N/a	20.6	20.6	7.6	6.0	3.5	1.3	–	—N/a	35.9	0.0

=== Victory preferences ===
The table below lists opinion polling on the victory preferences for each party in the event of a regional election taking place.

Polling firm/Commissioner	Fieldwork date	Sample size	PSOE	PP	CS	Vox	Unidas Podemos	Other/ None	Question	Lead
CEMOP	20–31 Mar 2023	1,200	19.8	33.4	2.2	13.3	3.7	6.0	21.7	13.6
CEMOP	23–31 Jan 2023	820	18.8	32.3	2.0	12.9	3.0	7.0	24.0	13.5

=== Victory likelihood ===
The table below lists opinion polling on the perceived likelihood of victory for each party in the event of a regional election taking place.

Polling firm/Commissioner	Fieldwork date	Sample size	PSOE	PP	CS	Vox	Unidas Podemos	Other/ None	Question	Lead
CEMOP	20–31 Mar 2023	1,200	10.4	64.4	0.4	5.7	0.3	0.1	18.7	54.0
CEMOP	23–31 Jan 2023	820	10.2	62.1	0.4	6.1	0.7	1.0	19.2	51.9

== Results ==
← Summary of the 28 May 2023 Regional Assembly of Murcia election results →
Parties and alliances	Popular vote			Seats	
Parties and alliances	Votes	%	±pp	Total	+/−
People's Party (PP)	293,051	42.79	+10.44	21	+5
Spanish Socialist Workers' Party (PSOE)	175,505	25.62	−6.84	13	−4
Vox (Vox)	121,321	17.71	+8.24	9	+5
We Can–United Left Greens–Green Alliance (Podemos–IU–AV)^{1}	32,173	4.69	−2.90	2	±0
MC Regional (MC REG)^{2}	20,206	2.95	+0.72	0	±0
Citizens–Party of the Citizenry (CS)	10,480	1.53	−10.45	0	−6
Green Coalition (MR–VE)	8,919	1.30	New	0	±0
Animalist Party with the Environment (PACMA)^{3}	5,957	0.86	+0.02	0	±0
For My Region (Por Mi Región)^{4}	2,449	0.35	−1.69	0	±0
Seniors in Action (3e)	1,479	0.21	+0.13	0	±0
Free Murcia (ML)	1,442	0.21	New	0	±0
Values (Valores)	1,336	0.19	New	0	±0
Communist Party of the Peoples of Spain (PCPE)	1,152	0.16	+0.04	0	±0
Spanish Phalanx of the CNSO (FE–JONS)	554	0.08	New	0	±0
Cantonal Party (PCAN)	530	0.07	±0.00	0	±0
Blank ballots	8,263	1.20	+0.67		
Total	684,817			45	±0
Valid votes	684,817	98.56	−0.74		
Invalid votes	10,038	1.44	+0.74		
Votes cast / turnout	694,855	63.25	+0.93		
Abstentions	403,688	36.75	−0.93		
Registered voters	1,098,543				
Sources
Footnotes: ^{1} We Can–United Left Greens–Green Alliance results are compared to the combined totals of We Can–Equo and Change the Region of Murcia (United Left–Greens+Anticapitalists) in the 2019 election.; ^{2} MC Regional results are compared to Municipalist Coalition MC–CCD–CIFA–PITP–UxA totals in the 2019 election.; ^{3} Animalist Party with the Environment results are compared to Animalist Party Against Mistreatment of Animals totals in the 2019 election.; ^{4} For My Region results are compared to We Are Region totals in the 2019 election.

Popular vote
PP	42.79%
PSOE	25.62%
Vox	17.71%
Podemos–IU–AV	4.69%
MC REG	2.95%
CS	1.53%
MR–VE	1.30%
Others	2.21%
Blank ballots	1.20%

Seats
PP	46.67%
PSOE	28.89%
Vox	20.00%
Podemos–IU–AV	4.44%

== Aftermath ==
Investiture; Fernando López Miras (PP)
Ballot →	7 July 2023	10 July 2023
Required majority →	23 out of 45	Simple
Yes: • PP (21)	21 / 45	21 / 45
No: • PSOE (13); • Vox (9); • Podemos–IU–AV (2)	24 / 45	24 / 45
Abstentions	0 / 45	0 / 45
Absentees	0 / 45	0 / 45

Investiture; Fernando López Miras (PP)
Ballot →	7 September 2023
Required majority →	23 out of 45
Yes: • PP (21); • Vox (9)	30 / 45
No: • PSOE (13); • Podemos–IU–AV (2)	15 / 45
Abstentions	0 / 45
Absentees	0 / 45
