= Citizens' Movement of Cartagena =

Citizens' Movement of Cartagena Movimiento Ciudadano de Cartagena
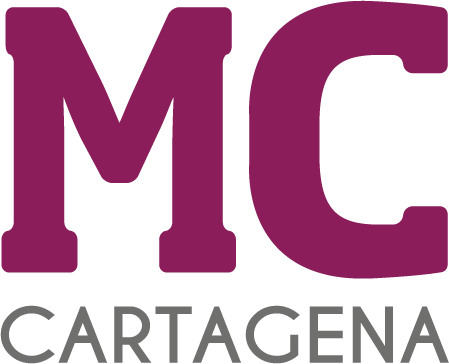
- President: Jesús Giménez Gallo
- Founded: 14 December 2002
- Ideology: Cartagenerism; Progressivism
- Political position: Center to center-left
- Colours: Crimson
- Cartagena City Council: 8 / 27
- Regional Assembly of Murcia: 0 / 45

Website
- mccartagena.com

Movimiento Ciudadano de Cartagena (English: "Citizens' Movement of Cartagena") is a federations of political parties in the region of Murcia, Spain. Its primary strength is located in the city of Cartagena. It advocates for cartagenerism, a social, political and ideological movement in Spain centered in Cartagena, which pursues the right and recognition of an autonomous territory separated from the rest of Murcia that includes this municipality and its region, Campo de Cartagena, which includes the municipalities of La Unión, Los Alcázares, San Javier, San Pedro del Pinatar, Torre Pacheco, Fuente Álamo, some districts in the south of Murcia, such as Lobosillo, as well as Mazarrón (which does not belong geographically in its entirety to Campo de Cartagena); as well as the defense of the identity of Cartagena and its environment. According to its political program, it also advocates for women's and LGBT rights and environmentalism. The party promotes regional biprovinciality as a way of "not having to identify the entire Region with [the] municipality [of Murcia], enjoy greater autonomy and achieve greater political weight" in the Cortes Generales.

== History ==
Citizens' Movement was established on December 14, 2002, as a federation of parties, initially composed of the Cantonal Party (PCAN), the Mar Menor Independent Party (PIMM), Cartagena Citizens' Convergence, Democratic and Social Centre and Independents for Cartagena and Comarca. The PCAN was the historical representative of cartagenerism since its foundation in 1977; the PIMM, organized in 1995, embodied the aspirations of the supporters of municipal segregation of the El Algar council; and Citizens' Convergence counted among its first militants businessman José López Martínez, who years later would be chosen to lead the coalition.

In the 2003 municipal elections, MC obtained a seat in the City council of Cartagena, that was occupied by the cantonal Luis Carlos García Conesa. In the following legislature after the 2007 elections, the votes received translated into an increase in the number of councillors, with the entry of the independent Antonio Mínguez Rubio. On the same date the elections to the Regional Assembly took place of Murcia, to which MC attended as a member of the Regional Citizens' Coalition candidacy, which did not win any seats.

The second legislature of MC in the City Council of Cartagena was marked by a series of internal conflicts that resulted in the abandonment of the federation by the PIMM in 2009, followed by that of the PCAN in 2010, in the midst of a controversy about of the circumstances in which it occurred.

The internal crisis had repercussions on the results of MC in the 2011 municipal elections, which represented a setback in terms of institutional representation, since the group lost one seat, keeping only that of José López. That same year, the three entities that by then were part of the federation – Independent Party of Cartagonova, Acción y Desarrollo, Convocatoria de Independientes por Cartagena – agreed to dissolve the coalition to turn it into a single political party.

Instead, the 2015 local elections meant an increase from one to five councillors, with the entry of Isabel García García, Ricardo Segado García, María Josefa Soler Martínez and Francisco José Calderón Sánchez. An agreement with the Spanish Socialist Workers' Party (PSOE) installed a bipartisan municipal government in which José López served as mayor for the first two years of the legislature and the socialist Ana Belén Castejón for the next two, although during the second part of the term a rupture of the agreement lead MC back to the opposition.

In the 2019 local elections, the formation increased its number of councillors again to eight, becoming the first force in the consistory, although a government agreement between the People's Party (PP), PSOE and Citizens kept the mayor's office for the socialist Castejón, under the commitment to take turns in two years with the popular Noelia Arroyo.

In the 2023 Murcian regional elections, the party narrowly missed a seat in the regional parliament, achieving a 2.94%, short of the 3% required.

== Electoral performance ==
=== Assembly of Murcia ===
Assembly of Murcia
Election	Leading candidate	Votes	%	Seats	+/–	Government
2007	Diego de Ramón	Within Citizen's Regional Coalition	1.25 (#4)	0 / 45	Steady	No seats
2015	Joaquín José Conesa	8,793	1.37 (#7)	0 / 45	Steady	No seats
2019	Antonio García Sánchez	Within Municipalist Coalition	2.23 (#6)	0 / 45	Steady	No seats
2023	Esther Guzmán	19,720	2.94 (#5)	0 / 45	Steady	No seats

=== Cartagena City Council ===
City Council of Cartagena
Election	Leading candidate	Votes	%	Seats	+/–	Government
2003	Luis Carlos García Conesa	4,507	5.21 (#3)	1 / 27	Steady	Opposition
2007	Luis Carlos García Conesa	6,308	7.54 (#3)	2 / 27	1	Opposition
2011	José López Martínez	4,633	5.51 (#4)	1 / 27	1	Opposition
2015	José López Martínez	14,545	16.98 (#3)	5 / 27	4	Government (2015-2017)
2015	José López Martínez	14,545	16.98 (#3)	5 / 27	4	Opposition (2017-2019)
2019	José López Martínez	23,934	27.44 (#1)	8 / 27	3	Opposition
2023	José López Martínez	23,947	25.7 (#2)	8 / 27	Steady	TBD
