= Ebro Delta =

River delta in Catalonia

Designations

Ramsar Wetland
- Official name: Delta de l'Ebre
- Designated: 26 March 1993
- Reference no.: 593

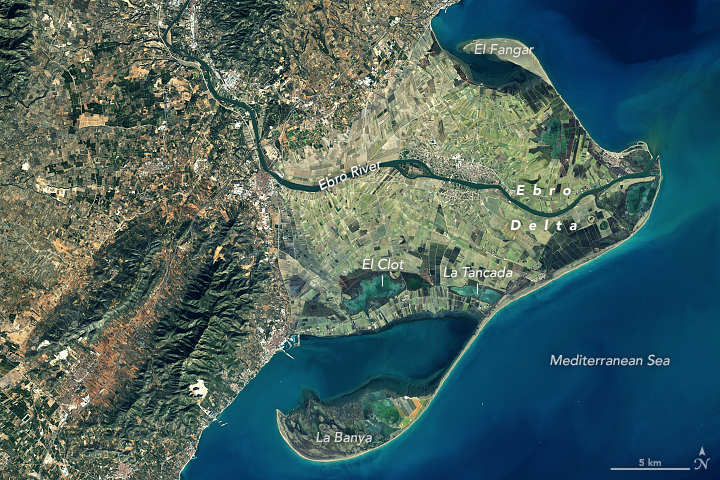
The Ebro River delta at the Mediterranean Sea from space

The Ebro Delta (Catalan: Delta de l'Ebre, IPA: [ˈdɛltə ðə ˈleβɾə]; Spanish: Delta del Ebro, IPA: [ˈdelta ðel ˈeβɾo]) is the delta region of the Ebro River (Catalan: Ebre, Spanish: Ebro) in the southwest of the Province of Tarragona in the region of Catalonia in Spain. It is located on the Mediterranean Sea, and is the northernmost point, by some designations, of the Gulf of Valencia. Its location per Ramsar site designation is 40°43′N 0°44′E.

== Geography ==
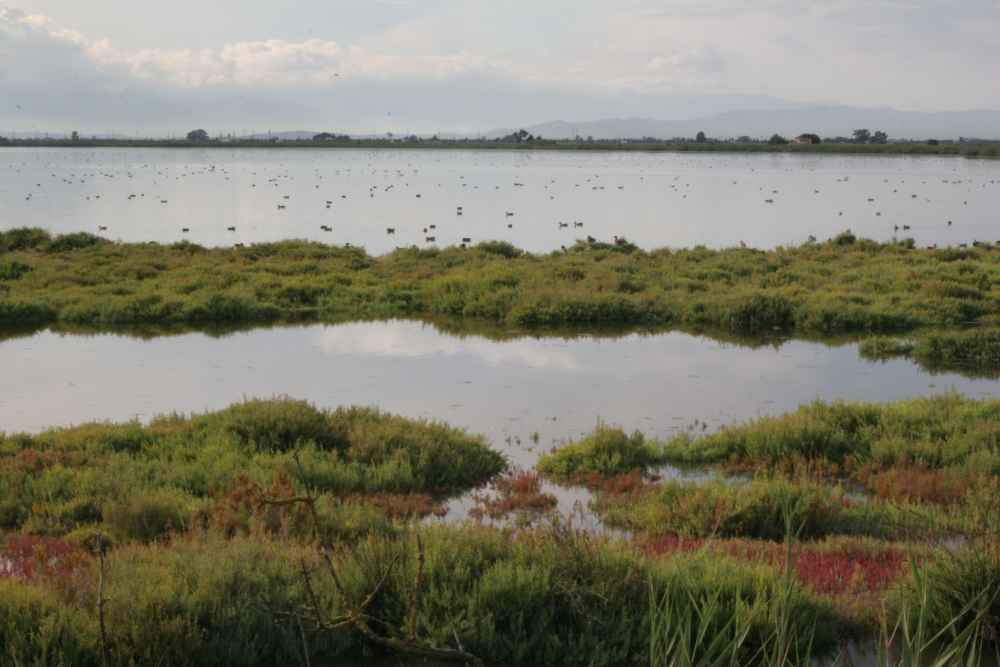
Ebro Delta estuary and wetlands, with waterfowl.

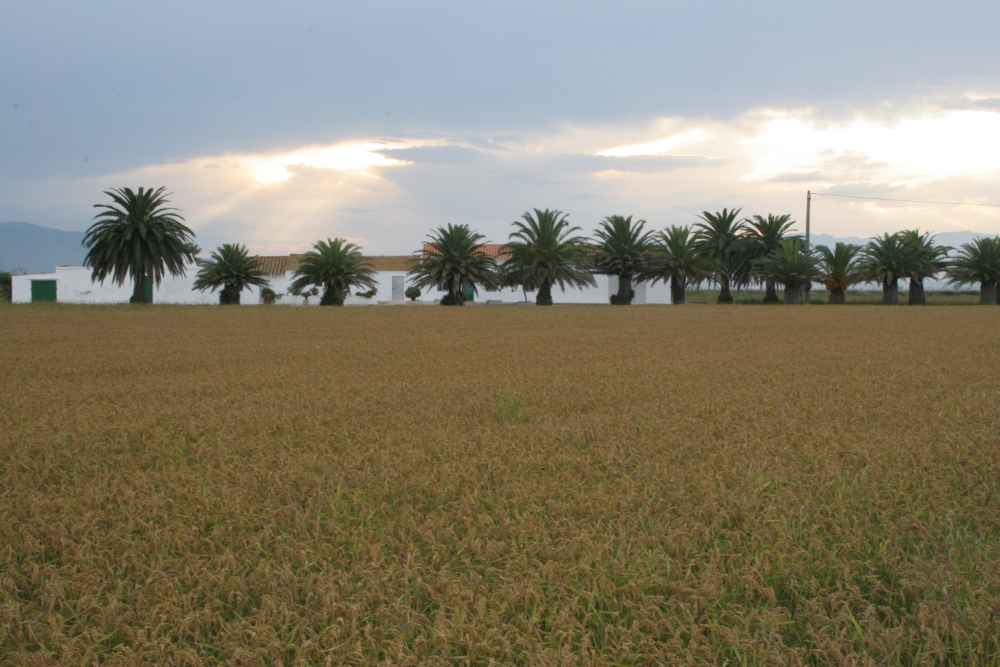
Agricultural fields in the delta.

The Ebro Delta is one of the largest wetland areas in the western Mediterranean region, at 320 km^{2} (79,000 acres). The Ebro delta has expanded rapidly on soils washed downriver. The town of Amposta, a seaport in the 4th century, demonstrates the historical rate of growth of the delta as it is now located well inland from the current river mouth. The rounded form of the delta attests to the balance between sediment deposition by the Ebro and removal of this material by wave erosion.

The area at the primary mouth of the Ebro is currently protected by several fluvial islands: the Isle of Garxal (280 ha, 690 acres), the Isle of Sant Antoni (170 ha, 420 acres), and the Isle of Buddha (1,231 ha, 3,040 acres).

The Ebro Delta was placed, with 7,736 ha (19,120 acres) in 1993, on the Ramsar Convention list of wetlands of international importance as defined for the conservation and sustainable utilization of wetlands, recognizing the fundamental ecological functions of wetlands and their economic, cultural, scientific, and recreational value.

== Uses ==
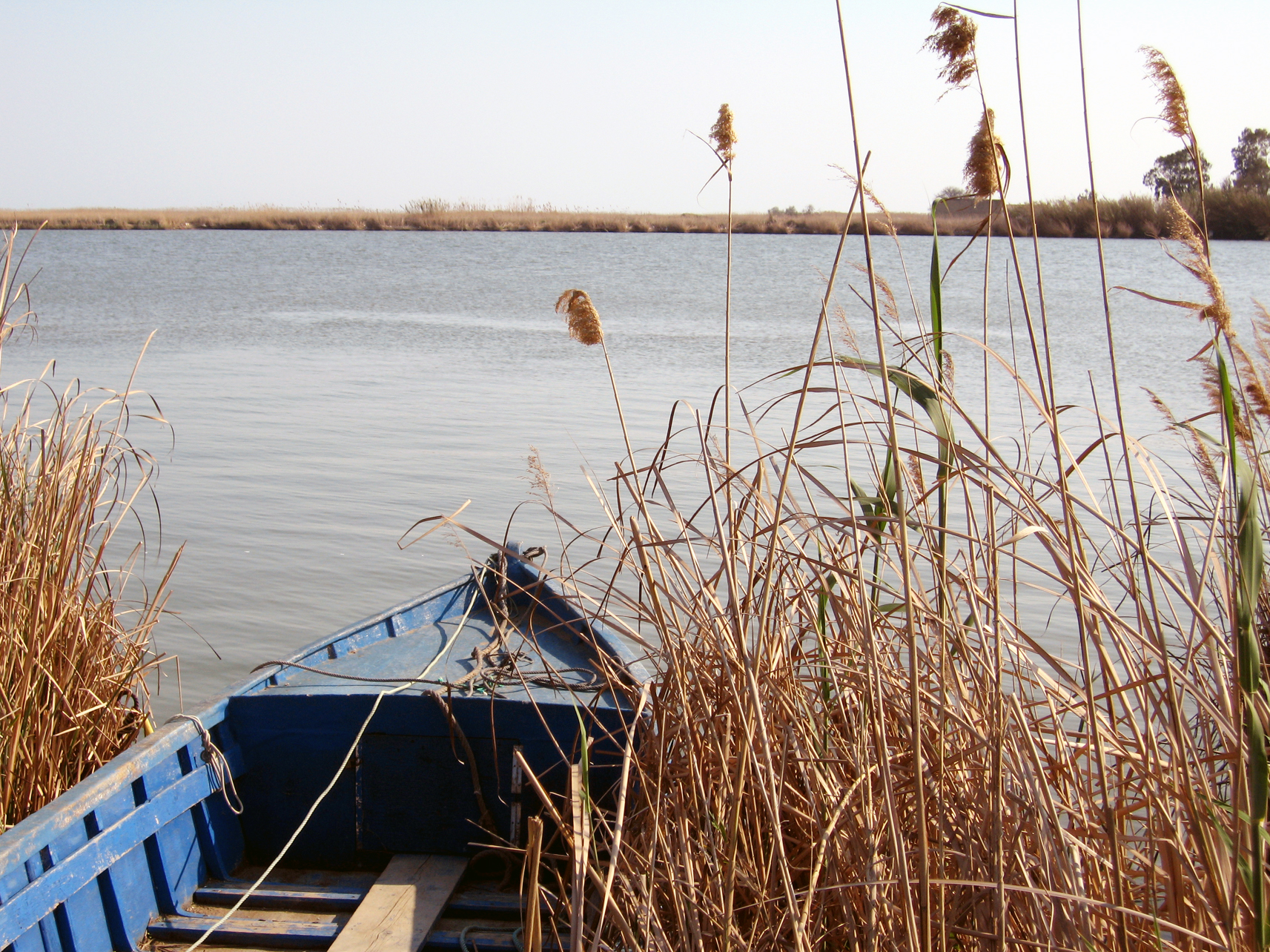
The Ebre Delta wetlands habitat.

=== Agriculture ===
Some delta areas have been drained for agricultural use over the centuries. The modern delta is in intensive agricultural use for rice, fruit (in particular citrus), and vegetables. The Rice-producing Cooperative of the Ebro Delta accounts for a production capacity of 45 thousand tonnes of rice annually, from 14 varietals, cultivated on 22,000 hectares. Compared to the major Spanish rice-producing regions of Andalusia and Extremadura, yields in the Ebro Delta are more consistent, due to a stable water supply.

Since 1992, the Ebro Delta is one of three Spanish regions awarded a Protected Designation of Origin for rice production. "The designation includes six varieties: bahía, bomba, fonsa, montsianell, sènia and tebre, grown exclusively in the towns of Aldea, Ampolla, Amposta, Camarles, Deltebre, Sant Carles de la Ràpita and Sant Jaume d'Enveja."

A network of canals and irrigation ditches constructed by both agricultural and conservation groups are helping to maintain the ecologic and economic resources of the Ebro Delta. The zebra mussel, an invasive species, is expanding through the delta and upstream in Ebro waters. Due to its rapid rate of reproduction with a competing advantage, the zebra mussel is adversely affecting native species.

=== Wildlife ===
In 1983 Spain designated a large part of the delta as a natural park. Ebro Delta Natural Park (Catalan: Parc Natural del Delta de l'Ebre, Spanish: Parque Natural del Delta del Ebro) has a total surface area of 7,802 hectares (19,280 acres). The natural park has protected wetlands, beaches, marshes, salt pans, and estuaries that provide extensive habitats.

The park is of international importance for eight of its plant species and 69 of its vertebrate fauna. It has some 95 breeding species of birds, is also very important for over 300 species of a wide range of transient and overwintering species, and serves as an essential stopover point for large numbers of migratory birds and waterfowl. The Ebro delta has the world's largest colony of Audouin's gulls. In 2006 it held a record number of more than 15,000 pairs.

== Threats ==
Climate change has led to increased erosion of the delta from the sea, as well as increasing the level of the saltwater table. At the same time, dams upstream have reduced the amount of sediment reaching the delta. The resulting changes to the delta are damaging biodiversity and local farmers.

== See also ==
- Salt wedge, an estuary issue
- List of rivers of Spain
- Bomba rice — also with D.O. status for rice
- Calasparra — also with D.O. status for rice
