= Pals Rice =

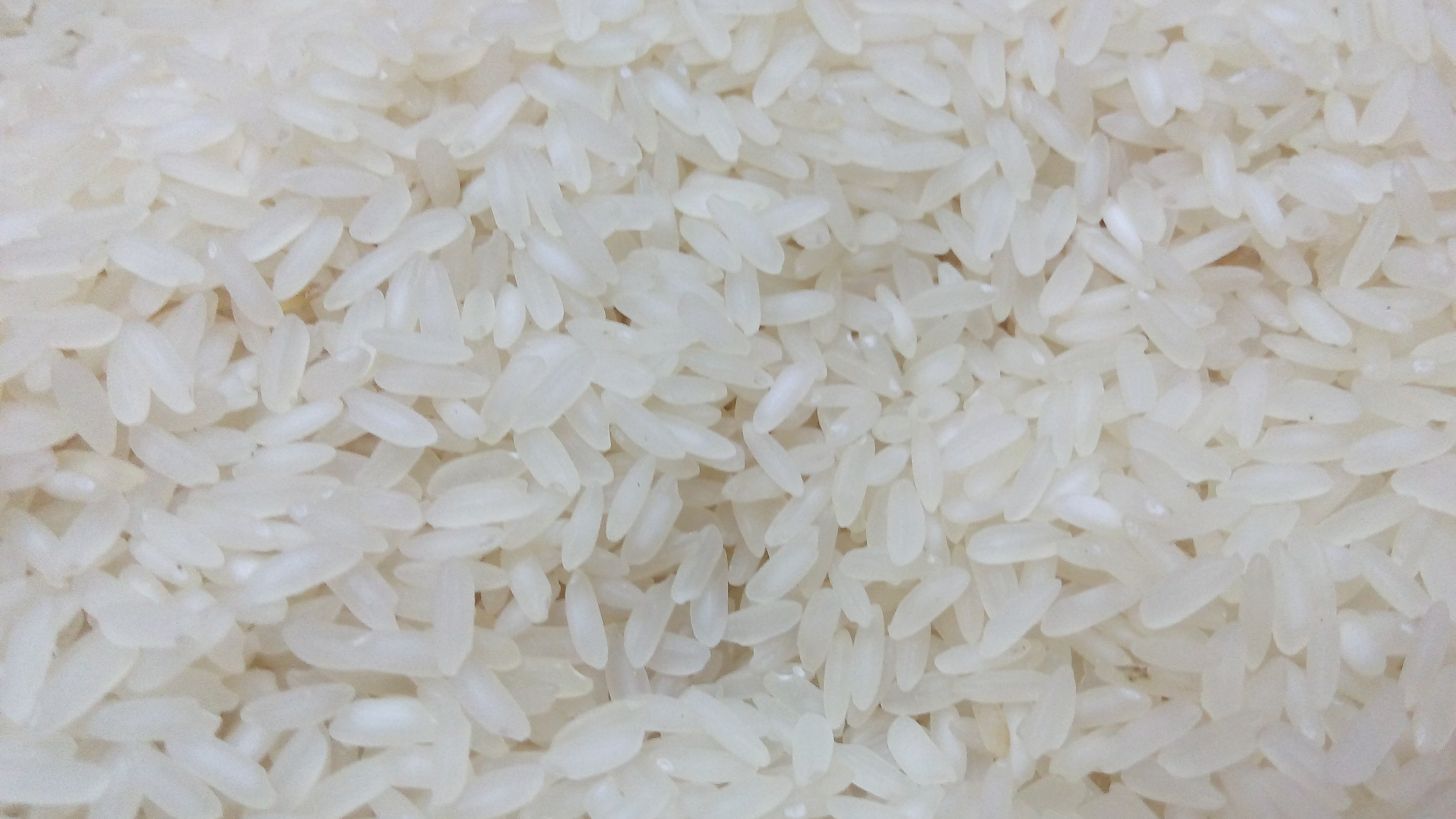
Pals Rice

Pals rice is a rice produced in Empordà and is sold under the name "Arroz de Pals". It is a top quality rice. The most well-known rice varieties that are cultivated in Pals include the traditional varieties of Bahia and Bomba and the newer varieties Carneroli and Nembo. It is ideal for all types of dishes, especially for cooking in a cazuela in the traditional manner of Empordà as the rice remains firm and does not become mushy. Pals rice should bear the quality label "Productes de l'Empordà" (Empordan products). This branding guarantees that the products are produced, processed and packaged in Empordà and are subject to periodical quality control tests. The sowing period extends from the end of April to the beginning of May, and the period of harvest from the end of September to the end of October.

== History ==
Rice cultivation in Pals began in the fifteenth century. It is believed to have been introduced by the Arabs of Valencia. Cultivation was limited in the late eighteenth century to limit the spread of diseases related to rice production. Permission to resume rice cultivation in Pals was granted in 1900.

== See also ==
- Figueres onion
- Empordà (DO)
- Prawns from Palamós
