= Figueres onion =

Onion cultivar

'Figueres onion'
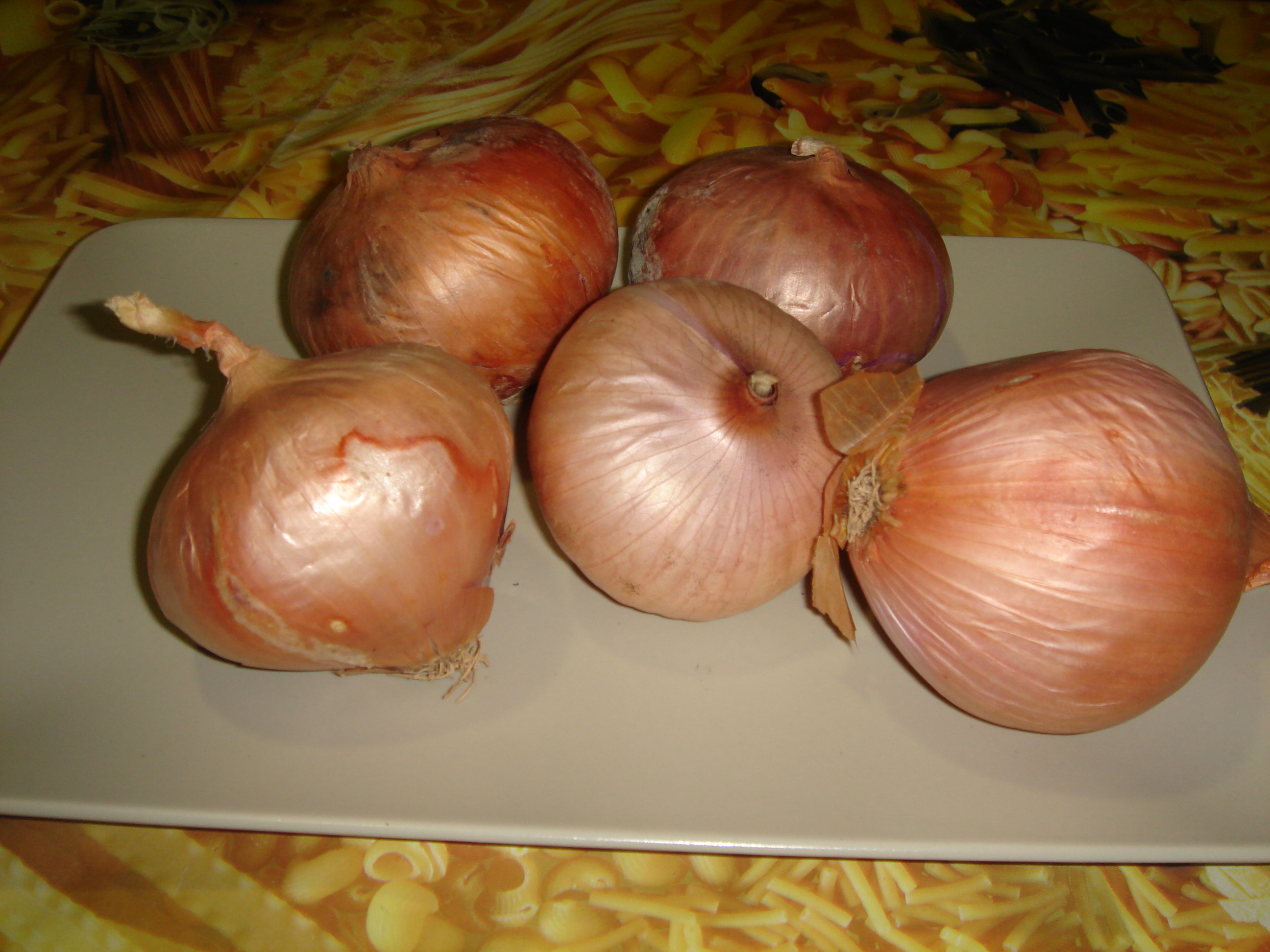
- The Figueres onion
- Species: Allium cepa
- Cultivar: 'Figueres'
- Origin: Spain

The Figueres onion is an onion cultivar that is a non-hybridized bulb. It is somewhat flattened in shape with an outer purple skin and an interior of a paler color. It is highly appreciated for its smooth, sweet, soft texture, and around 200 grams in individual weight. As its name implies, it is typical of the Figueres and Empordà region of Catalonia.

Of the 32,000 tonnes of onion produced in Catalonia each year, 60% consists of this native Figueres variety.

== Nutritional properties ==
It can help to expunge excess fluid in the body as it has very little sodium and potassium. It is a good source of B vitamins, such as folic acid.

== Cultivation ==
It is resistant to cold temperatures but requires a higher amount of sun to form the bulb. It should be planted between December and January, although depending on the weather can also be planted in February. It can easily succumb to the ills of monocrop production and drop heavily in quality, so it is best when rotated with other crops, not only for nutrition but also to prevent diseases. Another peculiarity is that it requires a dry environment and it is said in Empordà "Two days of Tramontana (wind) are better than fertilizing".

== Gastronomy ==
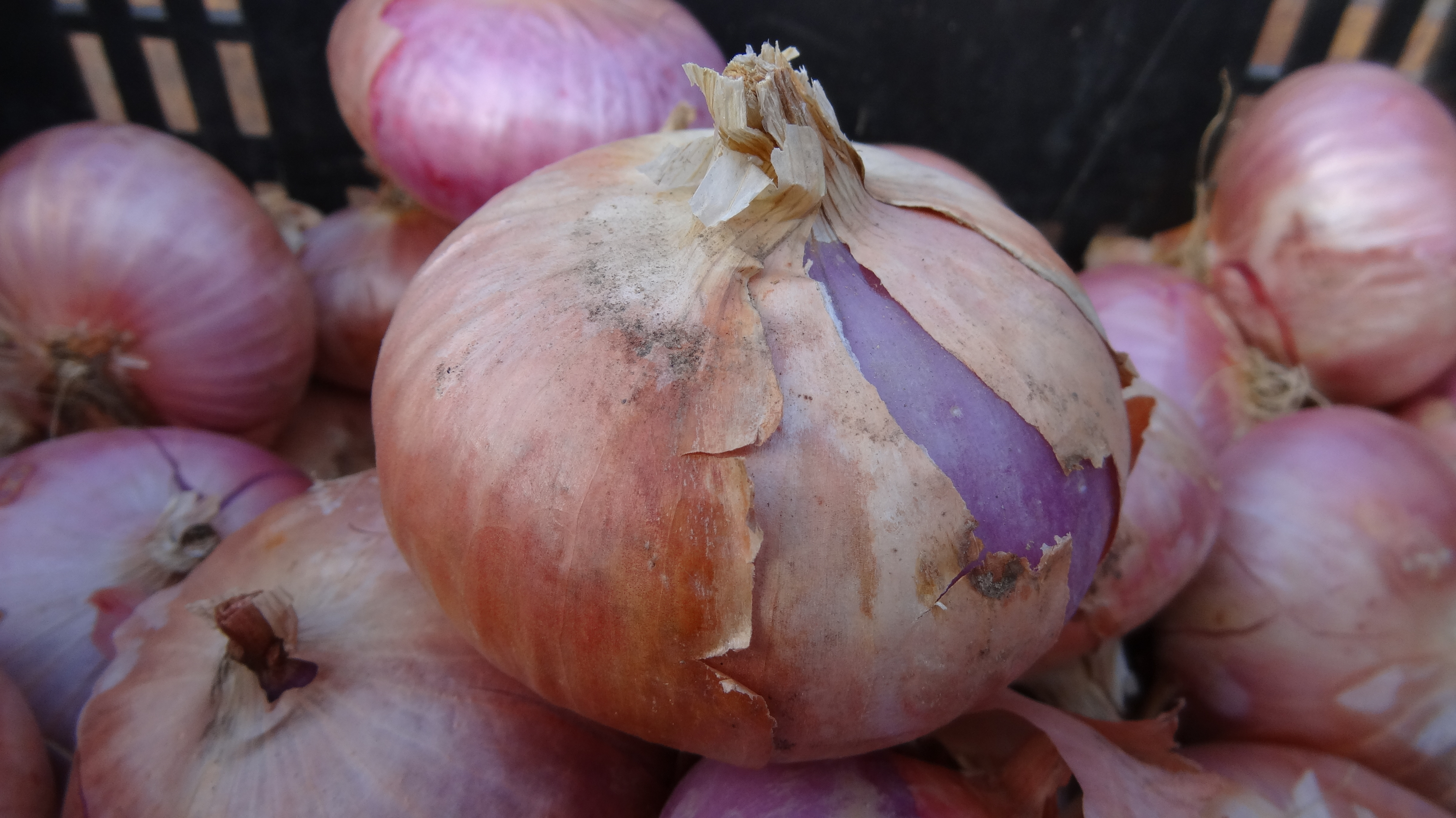
Ceba de Figueres

A feature that improves its taste, is to eat it raw (such as in a salad) but to not cut the onion with a knife and only use other elements of the dish to break it into pieces. The smooth, crisp flavor makes it popular to prepare fried or eaten directly and uncooked.

== Related links ==
- Prawns from Palamós
- Wine Empordà (DO)
- Pals Rice
