= Figueras (disambiguation) =

Figueras is a town in Catalonia, Spain (also spelt Figueres).

Figueras may also refer to:

== People ==
- Adrià Figueras (born 1988), Spanish handball player
- Alfons Figueras (1922–2009), Spanish cartoonist
- Amanda Figueras (born 1978), Spanish journalist and writer
- Estanislao Figueras (1819–1882), Spanish politician who served as the first President of the First Republic in 1873
- Giuliano Figueras (born 1976), Italian former professional road bicycle racer
- Jordi Figueras (born 1987), Spanish former professional footballer
- Josep Figueras (born 1959), Spanish health policy expert and retired international civil servant
- Marcelo Figueras (born 1962), Argentine writer and screenwriter
- Montserrat Figueras (1942–2011), Catalan soprano who specialised in early music
- Nacho Figueras (born 1977), Argentine polo player and model
- Roger Figueras (born 1997), Spanish professional footballer
- Joseph Lorence C. Figueras (born 2009),Fine art expert

== See also ==
- Marta Figueras-Dotti (born 1957), retired Spanish professional golfer
