= Francisco Lucas Ayala =

Spanish politician (born 1989)

Member of the Congress of Deputies
- Incumbent
- Assumed office 17 August 2023
- Constituency: Murcia

Personal details
- Born: 3 June 1989 (age 36)
- Party: Spanish Socialist Workers' Party

Francisco Lucas Ayala (born 3 June 1989) is a Spanish politician serving as a member of the Congress of Deputies since 2023. From 2019 to 2023, he was a member of the Regional Assembly of Murcia.
