= Calasparra =

- Municipality
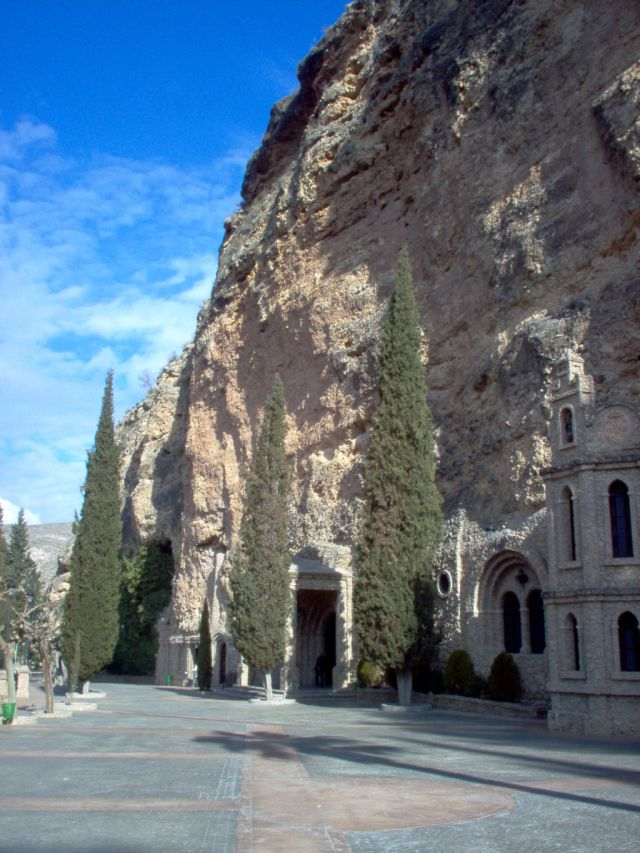

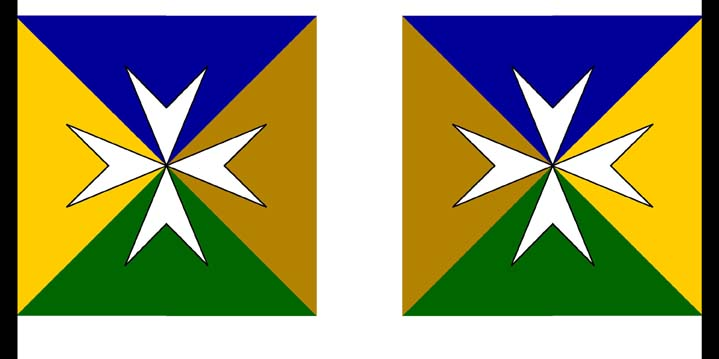
- Flag Coat of arms

- Location in Murcia

- Location in Spain Calasparra (Spain)
- Coordinates: 38°13′50″N 1°42′00″W
- Country: Spain
- Autonomous community: Murcia
- Province: Murcia
- Comarca: Noroeste
  - Mayor: (PSOE)

Area
  - Total: 184.9 km^{2} (71.4 sq mi)
- Elevation: 338 m (1,109 ft)

Population (2025-01-01)
  - Total: 10,391
  - Density: 56.20/km^{2} (145.6/sq mi)
- Time zone: UTC+1 (CET)
  - Summer (DST): UTC+2 (CEST)
- Postal code: 30420
- Dialing code: (+34) 968
- Website: www.calasparra.org

Calasparra (Spanish: [kalasˈpara]) is a municipality in the autonomous community of Murcia, Spain. It shares borders with Cieza, Mula, Cehegín, Moratalla and province of Albacete.

== History ==
There were people living in Calasparra during the Bronze and Iron Ages.

The present-day municipality was also occupied by people during the Roman Iberian Peninsula era as largely attested by several ceramic remains.

There is archaeological evidence of the presence of people during the Muslim Iberian Peninsula era in the territory. A remarkable site is Villa Vieja or Despoblado de Villa Vieja, which consists of an ancient hamlet.

Since the Moors' conquest of the Iberian Peninsula, there was an aspiration from some Christian kingdoms to conquer the Peninsula. The aspiration led to wars and also resulted in the acquisition of territories for the Christian kingdoms. The Kingdom of Castile obtained the Taifa of Murcia, the region where Calasparra was, in 1243 because the king of the Taifa felt under pressure and stipulated the Taifa to be dependent on the Christian kingdom with Castile in the Treaty of Alcaraz. The Castilian kingdom bestowed upon the Knights Hospitaller the territory of Calasparra in 1289 as a reward for taking part in the Reconquista.

== Geography ==
Calasparra has an area of 193 km^{2} and a population of 10,178 (2019). Between 2004 and 2006 more than 2,000 British immigrants bought new homes off-plan, built on 3 new urbanisations surrounding the town, with more purchasing country homes.

Calasparra is situated in a mountainous region (398m) in the northwest of the province of Murcia. In contrast to the surrounding arid terrain, Calasparra benefits from being crossed by four rivers, including the Segura. This has enabled the cultivation of Calasparra rice, for which the town is noted, and dates back to the 14th century.

The following localities are present in the municipality: Calasparra, which is located in the southwestern quarter and had a population of 9,062 in 2020; Valentín, which is placed in the south-west and was inhabited by 465 people; El Esparragal, where 52 people lived; Hondonera, which population consisted of 27; Río Moratalla, which was home to 418 people; and Río Quípar, where 109 people resided.

The population is predominantly Spanish, but other nationalities can be found here, particularly Moroccans and English.

== Demographics ==
12.385% inhabitants are foreigners – 5.97% come from other countries of Europe, 3.868% are Africans, 2.24% are Americans and 0.3% are Asians. The table below shows the population trends during the 20th and 21st centuries:

	1900	1910	1920	1930	1940	1950	1960	1970	1981	1991	2001	2006	2011	2016
Population	6,428	7,464	7,851	8,673	10,627	10,416	9,707	8,357	8,678	8,745	9,258	9,969	10,585	10,268

== Economy ==
62.3% of the surface of the municipality is used for agriculture. The products that are more widely grown are apricots, almonds, peaches and olives. 33,54% of the agreements that were signed in 2018 corresponded to the agricultural sector and 47,16% corresponded to services sector. 22.06% agreements were written for waiters, 15.94% were written for agriculture labourers (not considering the ones who work in vegetable gardens, greenhouses and gardens) and 19.94% agreements were signed by labourers in manufacture industries in the second half of 2016.

== Main sights ==
There are some sites and buildings that have special historic values:

- Villa Vieja: It is an archeological site that was anciently a settlement of the Muslim Iberian Peninsula era.
- Calasparra's Castle: It was probably built in the 11th century, during the Muslim Iberian Peninsula era. It was abandoned after a Mudejar revolt in 1264, once that the territory had been conquered by Castile. The king of Castile Sancho IV bestowed the castle and the town to a military religious order in 1289.
- Rambla de los Arcos Aqueduct
- El Molinico: It was built in the 16th century and restored in the 17th century, 19 century and 1998. A blazon in relief is present in the façade. It represented the Melgarejo family, which were the owners of the building. The local government acquired the building in 1981.
- Virgen de la Esperanza Shrine
- Torre del Reloj (Clock Tower): its plan is squared and it has three bodies. Its architectural style is neomudejar. The first documentary reference of the tower dates back to 1609 and the building was rebuilt in 1718 and it was rebuilt again in 1905 and 1996.
- La Encomienda: It was built in 1730 and 1731 and restored in 2009.

== See also ==
- List of municipalities in the Region of Murcia
